= Culture and menstruation =

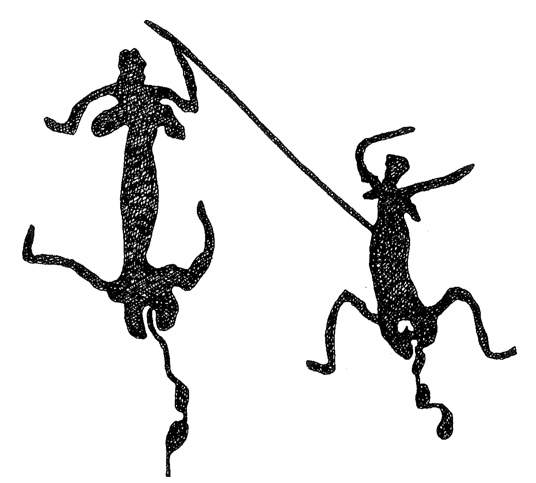
Two women dancing and menstruating. Rock art by Indigenous Australians from the Upper Yule River, Pilbara, Western Australia.

There are many cultural aspects surrounding how societies view menstruation. Different cultures view menstruation in different ways. The basis of many conduct norms and communication about menstruation in western industrial societies is the belief that menstruation should remain hidden. By contrast, in some indigenous hunter-gatherer societies, menstrual observances are viewed in a positive light, without any connotation of uncleanness. In most of India, menarche is celebrated as a rite of passage.

A menstrual taboo is any social taboo concerned with menstruation. In some societies it involves menstruation being perceived as unclean or embarrassing, inhibiting even the mention of menstruation whether in public (in the media and advertising) or in private (among friends, in the household, or with men). Many traditional religions consider menstruation ritually unclean, although anthropologists say that the concepts 'sacred' and 'unclean' may be intimately connected.

== Mythology ==
The terms menstruation and menses are derived from the Latin: mensis, lit. 'month', which in turn is cognate with the Ancient Greek: μήνη, romanized: mēnē, lit. 'lunar month', and the roots of the English words month and moon.

According to anthropologists Thomas Buckley and Alma Gottlieb, cross-cultural study shows that while taboos about menstruation are nearly universal, and while many of these involve notions of uncleanliness (ritual impurity), numerous menstrual traditions "bespeak quite different, even opposite, purposes and meanings." In some traditional societies, menstrual rituals are experienced by women as protective and empowering, offering women a space set apart from the male gaze and from unwanted sexual or domestic pressures and demands. In other words, the idea of the seclusion of the menstruation hut may be perceived as banishment of the woman seen to be impure and taboo, or as a welcome space and time free of the usual daily chores: isolation versus retreat.

An instructive example is provided by the anthropologist Wynne Maggi, who spent years living in the peasant society of the Kalash people of the Chitral District in northwestern Pakistan. She describes the communal bashali (large menstrual house) as the village's 'most holy place', respected by men, and serving as women's all-female organizing centre for establishing and maintaining gender solidarity and power. Also see the interview conducted in Period Matters with Kalash women where they describe themselves as being 'free' to make choices, and having the opportunity to rest during their period. According to one body of cultural evolutionary scholarship, the idea that menstrual blood marks the body as periodically sacred was initially established by female coalitions in their own interests, although later, with the rise of cattle-ownership and patriarchal power, these same beliefs and taboos were harnessed by religious patriarchs to intensify women's oppression.

Metaformic Theory, as proposed by cultural theorist Judy Grahn and others, places menstruation as a central organizing idea in the creation of culture and the formation of humans' earliest rituals.

=== Synchronisation with the moon ===
Menstruation in synchrony with the moon is widely assumed in myths and traditions as a ritual ideal. The idea that menstruation is—or ideally ought to be—in harmony with wider cosmic rhythms is one of the most tenacious ideas central to the myths and rituals of traditional communities across the world. One of the most thoroughgoing analyses of primitive mythology ever undertaken was that of the French anthropologist Claude Lévi-Strauss, who concluded that, taken together, the indigenous myths of North and South America expressed men's worry that, unless women's periods were carefully monitored and synchronised, the universe might descend into chaos.

In Aboriginal Australia, the supernatural being known as the 'Rainbow Snake' has been interpreted as, among other things, an indigenous way of conceptualising the ideal of synchronised tidal, lunar, menstrual and seasonal periodicities whose overall harmony (it is believed) confers spiritual power and fertility.

To many, such cultural associations appear persuasive as, in humans, the menstrual cycle quite closely approximates the moon's 29.5-day synodic cycle, unlike in chimpanzees (~36 days) or bonobos (~40 days). Statistical information from hunter gatherers is lacking, but where large-scale western studies focus on women's peak reproductive years—removing outlier values—the cycle length gravitates around 29.1–29.5 days, while the figure for women in their thirties shortens toward 28 days. In no current human population has statistically significant lunar phase-locking been demonstrated.

=== Sacred and powerful ===
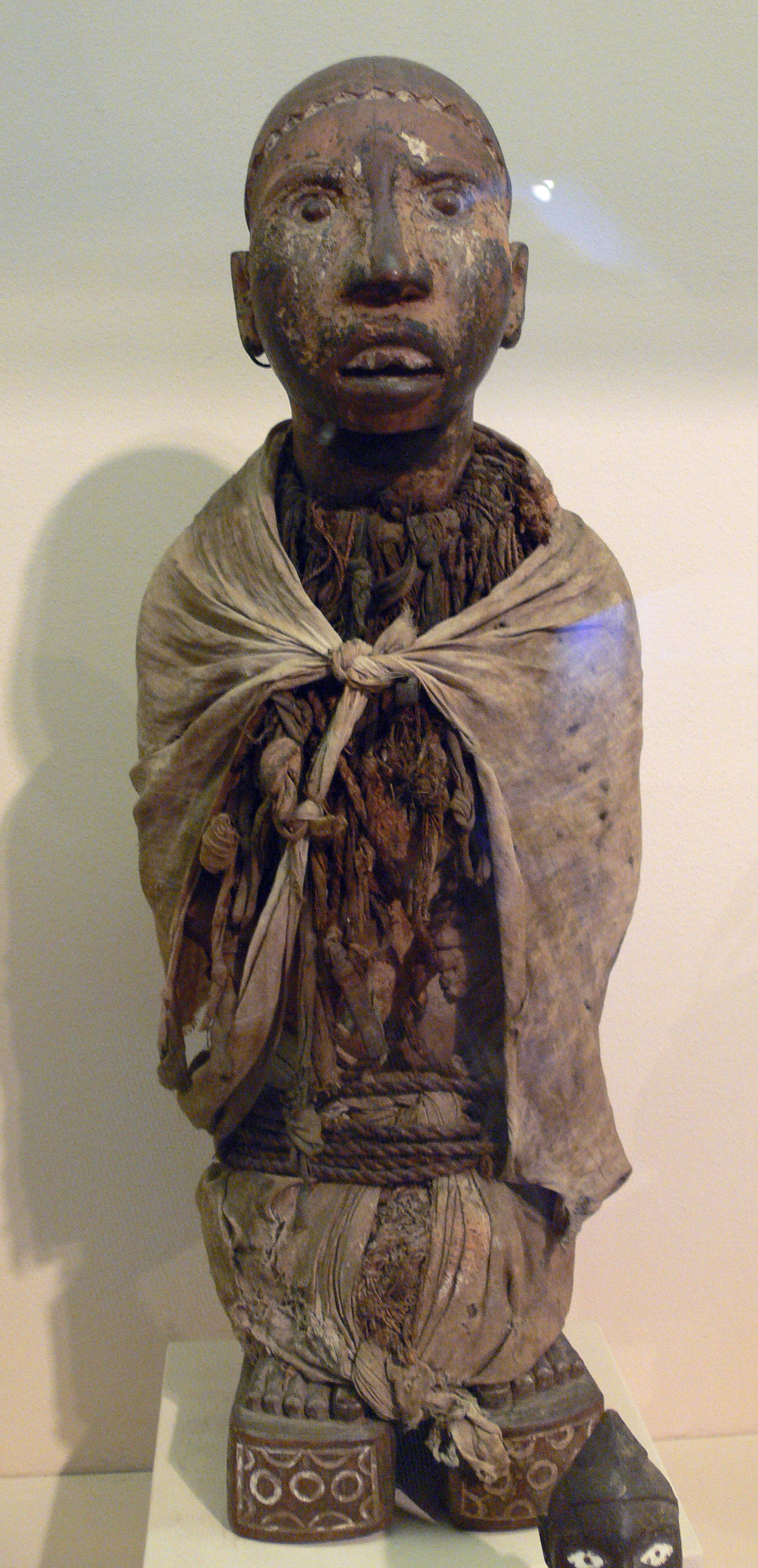
Angolan (Yombe) fetish to regulate menstruation

In some historic cultures, a menstruating woman was considered sacred and powerful, with increased psychic abilities, and strong enough to heal the sick. According to the Cherokee, menstrual blood was a source of feminine strength and had the power to destroy enemies. In Ancient Rome, Pliny the Elder wrote that a menstruating woman who uncovers her body can scare away hailstorms, whirlwinds and lightning. If she strips naked and walks around the field, caterpillars, worms and beetles fall off the ears of corn. Menstrual blood is viewed as especially dangerous to men's power. In Africa, menstrual blood is used in the most powerful magic charms in order to both purify and destroy. Mayan mythology explains the origin of menstruation as a punishment for violating the social rules governing marital alliance. The menstrual blood turns into snakes and insects used in black sorcery, before the Maya moon goddess is reborn from it.

Where women's blood is considered sacred, the belief is that it should be ritually set apart. According to this logic, it is when sacred blood comes into contact with profane things that it becomes experienced as ritually dangerous or 'unclean'. An example of this is Indian Artist Lyla FreeChild who internalised this belief and harvested her menstrual blood to paint an image inspired by a dream where she saw herself as the powerful, bleeding goddess Lajja Gauri. In an essay accompanying her art she explains her belief in the creative and healing power of menstrual blood.

== Menstruation and humoral medicine ==
Many beliefs about menstruation in the early modern period were linked to humorism, the system of medicine introduced by Ancient Greek and Roman physicians. People believed that the human body contained four humours: blood, phlegm, yellow bile, and black bile. Illnesses and problems were understood as being caused by dyscrasia, or an imbalance in the four humours. Treatments for disease had the aim of restoring a balance, curing the patient. The humoral model was a continuity during the early modern period, despite the fact that new medical theories began to arise in the second half of the eighteenth century, because these new ideas which used different treatments involving new chemicals were not as trusted since they were not properly established.

In this way medical and popular beliefs about menstrual problems such as irregular menstruation, amenorrhea (absence of periods whilst fertile) or dysmenorrhea (painful periods) were thought of in relation to the four humours. In early modern western Europe, physicians believed that the womb could not be too cold, hot, moist or dry and that an excess in any of these could impact a woman's fertility. Significantly, people believed that warmth encouraged sexual pleasure and increased the probability of conceiving a child, meaning that the womb had to be warm during intercourse. If a woman was found to be having problems menstruating which would then impact their fertility, remedies which aimed to alter the humoral state of the body were used. Aphrodisiacs were a common remedy given to women with menstrual problems, since they were believed to have internal heating effects, stimulating menstruation by redressing the constitutional balance of a womb that was too cold.

== Religious views ==
=== Totemism ===
The French sociologist Emile Durkheim argued that human religion in its entirety emerged originally in connection with menstruation. His argument was that a certain kind of action—collective ritual action—could establish simultaneously totemism, law, exogamy and kinship in addition to distinctively human language and thought. Everything began, according to Durkheim, when a flow of blood periodically ruptured relations between the sexes. "All blood is terrible", he claimed, "and all sorts of taboos are instituted to prevent contact with it".

This same blood was thought to run through the veins of women and animals alike, suggesting the blood's ultimate origin in 'totemic'—part-human, part-animal—ancestral beings. Once menstrual blood had been linked with the blood of the hunt, it became logically possible for a hunter to respect certain animals as if they were his kin, this being the essence of 'totemism'. Within the group's shared blood resided its 'god' or 'totem', from which it follows, according to Durkheim, that "the blood is a divine thing. When it runs out, the god is spilling over".

=== Buddhism ===
In Theravada and Hinayana Buddhism menstruation is viewed as "a natural physical excretion that women have to go through on a monthly basis, nothing more or less". However, in medieval Japanese Buddhism, menstruating women were often banned from visiting temples and sacred sites for their perceived impurity, primarily due to apocryphal texts such as the Blood Bowl Sutra, a prohibition which still exists in certain sites. Women are also currently not allowed to enter the sumo ring (dohyō) in Japan, a tradition stemming from Shinto and Buddhist beliefs that women are "impure" because of menstrual blood. In Sri Lankan Buddhism, not only menstruating women but husbands and other men who have been in a home with menstruating women are also banned from temples and shrines. By contrast, in the Kamakura Period, the founders of new Buddhist sects such as Hōnen, Shinran, and Nichiren did not consider menstruation as a spiritual obstacle to religious practice and allowed menstruating women into temples of their schools. In Bhutanese Buddhist traditions, menstruation was historically not considered impure according to the Vajrayana beliefs; in fact menstruation was considered holy and pure as a life source for enlightened beings. In Tantric Tibetan Buddhist texts the word for the vagina is 'pema' or lotus signifying the positive symbolism attached to a woman's body.

=== Christianity ===
Most Christian denominations do not follow any specific rituals or rules related to menstruation. Other denominations, such as those of Oriental Orthodox Christianity, follow rules similar to those laid out in the Holiness Code section of Leviticus, somewhat similar to the Jewish ritual of niddah. Pope Dionysius of Alexandria held with regard to menstruating women that "not even they themselves, being faithful and pious, would dare when in this state either to approach the Holy Table or to touch the body and blood of Christ." As such, Oriental Orthodox Christian women, such as those belonging to the Coptic Orthodox Church, do not attend church while they are menstruating.

Some Church Fathers defended the exclusion of women from ministry based on a notion of uncleanness. Others held that purity laws should be discarded as part of the Old Covenant. The 4th-century text Apostolic Constitutions says:

For neither lawful mixture, nor child-bearing, nor the menstrual purgation, nor nocturnal pollution, can defile the nature of a man, or separate the Holy Spirit from him. Nothing but impiety and unlawful practice can do that.

Some Christian churches, including many authorities of the Eastern Orthodox Church and some parts of the Oriental Orthodox Churches advise women not to receive communion during their menstrual period, not because menstruation is considered to be sinful, but for more intense preparation to approach Christ and due to the physical difficulties faced by women. This is a fairly common practice throughout Greece and Russia and other historically Orthodox Christian countries, as well as by Orthodox Christians in countries where they are in the minority, including Egypt, Kerala and Syria.

In 735 the Latin Church decided that women must be allowed to attend liturgies and receive Holy Communion during their menstruation.

In December 1866, Brigham Young gave advice that women should wait a week from the start of menstruation before participating in the endowment.

Some Church of Jesus Christ of Latter-day Saints temples in 2012 still did not allow women to perform baptisms for the dead during their menstrual period, despite official policy to the contrary.

=== Hinduism ===
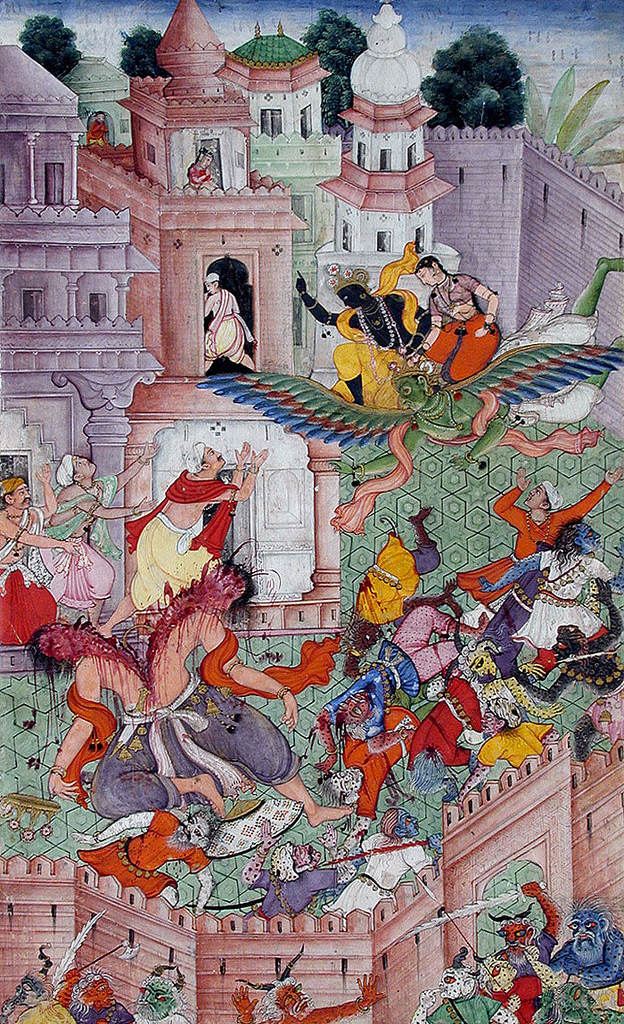
In spite of being born to Bhudevi and Varaha, Narakasura (shown here being killed by Krishna) turned out to be evil because he was conceived when his mother was undergoing menstruation.

Hinduism's views on menstruation are diverse. Menstruation is sometimes seen as a period of impurity, and women may or may not be separated from places of worship and/or any objects pertaining to them, for the length of their period. But, in contrast to Abrahamic religions and many other cultures across the world, one will also witness Hindus celebrating menstruation in various forms like the celebration of the onset of menstruation among young girls. This forms the basis of most of the cultural practices and restrictions around menstruation in Hinduism. In Guwahati, India a festival is celebrated known as the Ambubasi Mela where devotees gather outside the Kamakhya Temple and fast for four days to honour the goddess Maa Kamakhya who is believed to be on her annual menstrual cycle. The temple doors are kept shut so that the goddess is not disturbed during what is believed to be the most powerful, sacred time for her. On the last day of the festival the head priest bathes the shrine of the goddess and performs rituals before opening the gates again.

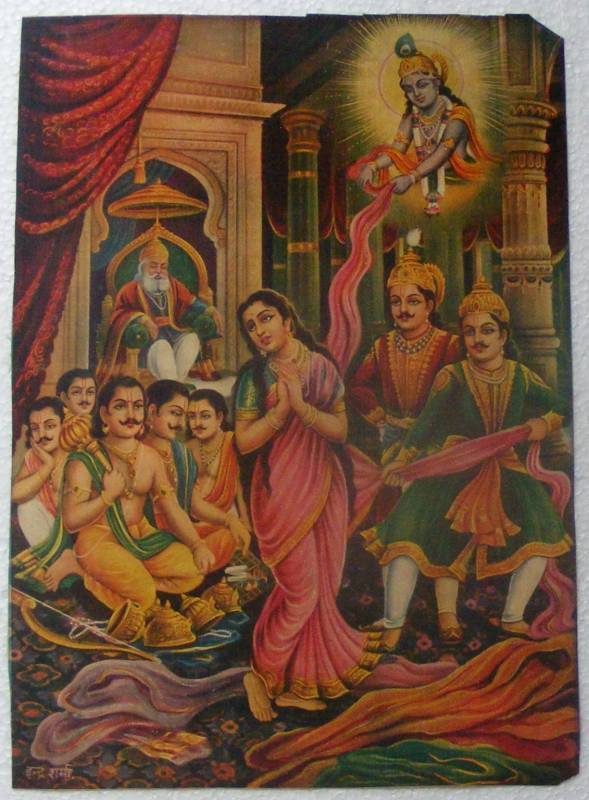
Vastraharan of Draupadi in Mahabharata

In Mahabharata, one of the two major Hindu epics, Draupadi, the wife of Pandavas was attempted to be disrobed by her brother-in-law Dushasana while she was menstruating.

According to the Memoir of the Survey of the Travancore and Cochin States, which was published in two volumes by the Madras government in the 19th century, women of menstruating age were denied entry into the Sabarimala Temple two centuries ago. Though the authors, lieutenants of the Madras Infantry, completed the survey by the end of the year 1820 after nearly five years of research, it was published in two volumes only in 1893 and 1901. According to the report, girls and women capable of pregnancy are prohibited from approaching the temple, while elderly women and pre-pubescent girls are permitted to do so. This is due to the deity's (Ayyappan) aversion to any sexual activity in the vicinity. In 1991, the Kerala High Court restricted entry of women above the age of 10 and below the age of 50 from the temple as they were of the menstruating age. However, on 28 September 2018, the Supreme Court of India lifted the ban on the entry of women. It said that discrimination against women on any grounds, even religious, is unconstitutional.

Sanctity of the Lingaraja Temple is maintained by disallowing menstruating women, as well as dogs, unbathed people, and families that encountered birth or death in the preceding 12 days.

In Indonesia, menstruating women are restricted from entering any Hindu temple.

=== Islam ===
During menstrual periods, women are forbidden from performing prayers. Sets of rules are advised for women to follow while during menstruation. They should not fast and left over fasts of Ramadan are to be completed during other days. During menses pilgrimages are allowed; and circumambulation of the Kaaba is also permitted. They are permitted to enter the praying place of the mosque but are not allowed to pray. They are encouraged to be present at Muslim gatherings and festivals (Eids). After the period, a bath (Ghusl), which is also required of both partners after sex, is also required before prayer may continue.

And they ask you about menstruation; Say It is harm/unclean, so keep away from women during menstruation; And do not approach them until they become pure And when they have purified themselves, then come to them from where Allah has ordained for you; Indeed, Allah loves those who are constantly repentant and loves those who purify themselves. Your women are your tilth, so come to your tilth as you wish and put forth for yourselves; And fear Allah and know that you will meet Him; And give good tidings to the believers. (Al-Quran 2:222-223)

The traditional Islamic interpretation of the Qur'an forbids intercourse during a woman's menstrual period, but allows for physical intimacy and other sexual acts that are not intercourse. If a man is engaged in sexual intercourse with his wife and discovers that her period has started, he must immediately withdraw.

On authority of Urwa:

"A person asked me, 'Can a woman in menses serve me? And can a Junub woman come close to me?' I replied, 'All this is easy for me. All of them can serve me, and there is no harm for any other person to do the same. 'Aisha told me that she used to comb the hair of Allah's Apostle while she was in her menses, and he was in Itikaf (in the mosque). He would bring his head near her in her room and she would comb his hair, while she used to be in her menses.'"

The Prophet said in Al-Bukhārī also reported in his Ṣahīh (no. 3835), "Your menstruation is not in your hand." And further, "This is a matter which Allah has ordained for all the daughters of Adam."

Some universities in strict Islamic contexts like Pakistan have become more open to helping their students during their period, and have made their institutions period friendly by installing vending machines, have quiet rooms for women to rest and considering instituting period leave as a policy.

Still, within many modern contemporary Muslim communities, menstruating women are barred from fasting during Ramadhan, entering a mosque, praying and making the full pilgrimage to Mecca, despite the fact that the textual basis of these injunctions in the Quran is widely debated.

=== Judaism ===
In Judaism, a woman during menstruation is called niddah and has some restrictions. For example, the Torah prohibits sexual intercourse with a menstruating woman. The ritual exclusion of niddah applies to a woman while menstruating and for about a week thereafter, until she immerses herself in a mikvah (ritual bath) and is intended only for married women. During this time, a married couple must avoid sexual intercourse and physical intimacy. Orthodox Judaism forbids women and men from touching or passing things to each other during this period.

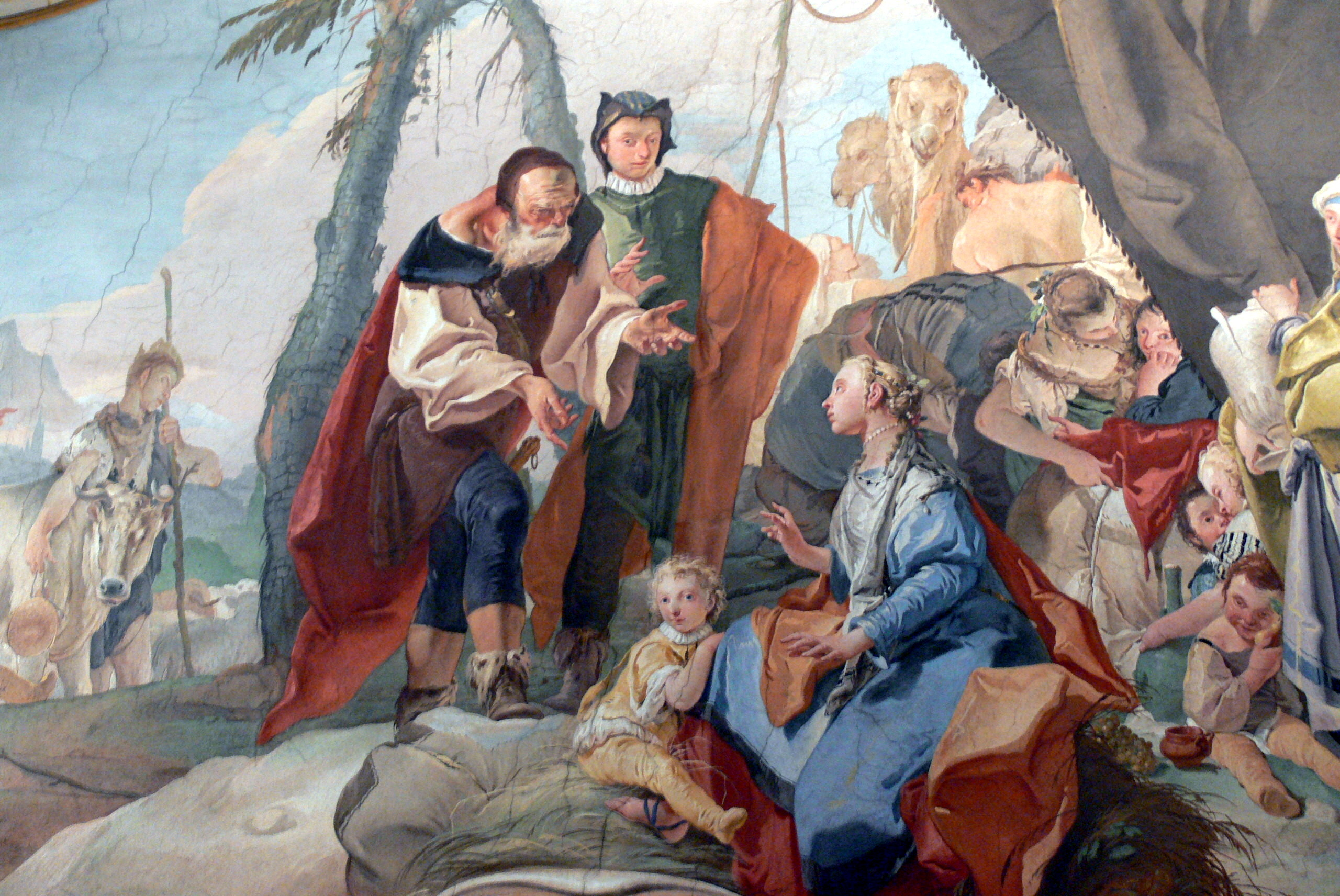
"Laban is looking for the idols." by Giovanni Battista Tiepolo

In the Torah (Leviticus 15:19-30), a menstruating female is considered ritually unclean: "anyone who touches her will be unclean until evening" (New International Version). Touching a menstruating female, touching an object she had sat on or lain on, or having intercourse with her also makes a person ritually unclean. The extent to which these rules are observed in modern Judaism varies depending on the degree of conservatism/orthodoxy. In 2006, the Committee on Jewish Law and Standards addressed the role of niddah in Conservative Judaism, considering it in the context of ritual purity concepts from the Temple in contemporary Judaism. One responsum adopted by a majority of the Committee held that concepts of ritual purity relevant to entry into the Temple are no longer applicable to contemporary Judaism and accepted a proposal to change the term "family purity" to "family holiness" and to explain the continuing observance of niddah on a different basis from continuity with Temple practices. Another responsum, also adopted by a majority of the Committee, called for retaining existing observances, terminology, and rationale, and held that these Temple-related observances and concepts continued to have contemporary impact and meaning. Thus, consistent with Conservative Judaism's philosophy of pluralism, both views of the continuing relevance of Temple-related concepts of ritual purity are permissible Conservative views.

In Genesis 31:34-35, menstruation is referenced in a story, where Rachel was, or pretended to be in her menstrual period:

Now Rachel had taken the teraphim, and put them in the saddle of the camel, and sat upon them. And Laban felt about all the tent, but found them not. And she said to her father: 'Let not my lord be angry that I cannot rise up before thee; for the manner of women is upon me.' And he searched, but found not the teraphim.

Outside of mainstream Judaism, in 2025 the International Israelite Board of Rabbis voted to allow women to become rabbis, but it ruled that when women rabbis are considered ritually impure, which includes (as well as other times) during menstruation, others must do their religious duties.

=== Sikhism ===
Menstruation does not lead to women being considered impure in Sikhism, and women's behavior is not restricted during the time when they are menstruating.

In The Feminine Principle in the Sikh vision of the Transcendent, Nikky Guninder Kaur-Singh writes:

The denigration of the female body "expressed in many cultural and religious taboos surrounding menstruation and child-Birth" is absent in the Sikh worldview. Guru Nanak openly chides those who attribute pollution to women because of menstruation.

=== Minor religions ===
==== Baháʼí Faith ====
Bahá'u'lláh, the founder of the Baháʼí Faith, in the Kitáb-i-Aqdas abolished all forms of ritual impurity of people and things and stressed the importance of cleanliness and spiritual purity. Menstruating women are encouraged to pray and are not required to fast; they have the (voluntary) alternative of reciting a verse instead.

==== Chinese religions ====
In Chinese belief systems, women are not supposed to touch sacred statues, make offerings, or pray to sacred statues on their menstrual cycle. Before the revolution some temples only permitted men, and women who were very old or very young, to attend. Chinese views of menstruation are still deeply influenced by Confucianism values of virtue and chastity. Many women feel empowered and feminine in their early years of starting their menstrual cycles.

==== Jainism ====
In Jainism, the bleeding that occurs in menstruation is thought to kill micro-organisms in the body, making the female body exhausted, causing cramps, and producing stress. Hence, women are expected to rest and not perform any religious duties for a duration of four days. In this time, the man of the house may take up the duties of the woman.

==== Shinto ====
In Japan, the religion of Shinto did and still does play a part in their society. The Kami, the spirits they worshiped, would not grant wishes to those who had traces of blood, dirt, or death on them. While menstruation is not entirely blood, the ancient Japanese did not know that. As a result, women who were menstruating were not allowed to visit any of the Kami shrines for the duration of their menstrual period. Even today, women are not allowed to enter Shinto shrines and temples during menstruation, and in some instances, women are completely banned from climbing the tops of sacred mountains due to their 'impurity'. Furthermore, the tradition is kept somewhat alive in the belief that the shedding of the endometrial lining is a kind of death. The tradition relates to the thought that any death in the family brings impurity and those experiencing this must wait a certain amount of time before being able to return to shrines and other holy areas. Women are also not allowed to enter the professional sumo wrestling ring (dohyō), a tradition stemming from Shinto and Buddhist beliefs that women are "impure" because of menstrual blood.

==== Zoroastrianism ====
Zoroastrianism has historically considered it to be a woman's moral duty to sequester herself during menstruation so that her touch or glance would not "contaminate". It is unclear to what degree this practice has ever been implemented. In mid-20th-century India it was common for Zoroastrian women with menses to live alone in one part of the house, wearing old clothes and using metal utensils. Zoroastrian women in Iran at this time typically lived in an outbuilding away from water or fire during menstruation. Many Zoroastrians today see such stringent approaches as outdated or irrational. Zoroastrian women in Iran and India may still voluntarily isolate themselves after childbirth or during menstruation, and take care to keep distance from fires and avoid touching sacred objects and books. Zoroastrian women raised in the diaspora are less likely to observe these kind of restrictions.

==== Wicca and paganism ====
Menstruation is mentioned in some Wiccan and pagan texts. There are collected books and material on Witchcraft and menstruation at the Museum of Witchcraft and Magic.

In the 2010s public Wiccan and pagan practitioners began sharing rituals, spells and histories of menstruation in these belief systems. Pagan rituals and histories of menstruation is also discussed in books such as Penelope Shuttle and Peter Redgrove's The Wise Wound: Menstruation and Everywoman.

=== Impact of religious views on contemporary taboos on menstruation ===
The views of menstruation in various religions including Judaism, Christianity and Islam are primarily responsible for the current shame, stigma and censure that surrounds menstruation and menstrual practices in many societies including Western societies like the United States and the United Kingdom. Many cultures considered Western heap various restrictions on menstruating women with studies showing that secular women in countries like the United States, Great Britain, Canada and Mexico endorse many taboos, myths and negative feelings around menstruation, and which are often perpetuated by mass marketing that portrays menstruation as dirty and polluting, consequently necessitating its secretive management with sanitary products. The contemporary stigma and shame surrounding menstruation is reflected in the use of euphemisms that involve shame and censure to speak about menstruation rather than addressing menstruation using simple, neutral and scientific terms as a normal biological process. Judaism, Christianity and Islam constitute about 54% of the world's contemporary population such that their lessons on menstruation which are inherently rooted in patriarchal ideology have become widely accepted throughout the world.

One of such dominant views of menstruation attributable to the Judeo-Christian-Islamic heritage is the view of menstruation as a curse, and in communities influenced by these three religions, the view of menstruation as a curse is conjoined with the notions of stigma and pollution. Through these notions, menstruating women and girls are ostracized as posing symbolic danger which necessitates various measures against them. The view of menstruation as a curse within these religions is not only restricted to religious communities; even in the absence of religion, menstruators are still viewed with disgust and stigma, and required to verbally and spatially separate from non-menstruators. Consequently, taboos around menstruation and views of menstruation as a curse and activity to be restricted spread beyond religious contexts centered around Jewish, Christian and Muslim communities to become universal and conventional expectations concerning menstruation.

== By region ==
=== Africa ===
Across the continent of Africa, a wide variety of menstruation-related customs have been recorded. In 2014 UNESCO reported that an estimated 10% of girls in Sub-Saharan Africa do not go to school while menstruating. This is likely due to a lack of resources rather than cultural customs of exclusion, but it depends on context and country and tribe and customs.

==== Ghana ====
Religious taboos and social stigma concerning menstruation contribute to a lack of access to school for girls in Ghana. In rural areas of the country 95% of girls have reported missing school during their periods. The World Bank estimates that 11.5 million women in Ghana do not have access to adequate hygiene and sanitation.

==== Zambia ====
A cloth torn from the traditional wrap (chitenge) is worn, part tied around the waist and part looped under the crotch, to catch menstrual fluid. Menarche (the first menstrual cycle at puberty) is traditionally treated as a sign that the girl is probably ready for sex and marriage, as well as for adult duties in the household. Initiation rites on menarche include instruction on sex and marital relations as well as on menstrual management. This is conducted by older women. It is taboo to talk about menstruation with men, or to learn from one's own mother.

=== South and South East Asia ===
In some portions of South Asia, there is a menstrual taboo, with it frequently being considered impure. Restrictions on movement, behaviour and eating are frequently placed. According to a 2018 study, more than one-third of girls across South Asia do not go to school during menstruation. However, there are many perspectives from across the region which show the great diversity in how menstruation is experienced depending on caste, class, socio-economic background, religion and gender. A more intersectional approach allows for a fuller appreciation of the different challenges menstruators' experiences.

For instance the Christian women of the Lahore sweeper community face specific challenges around menstruation because of their gender, position as a minority in a Muslim country, their occupation with dirt, and lack of toilets in public spaces where they work. In Bangladesh female factory workers in the retail garments sector experience constraints around long working hours, clean, female only toilets, disposal facilities and basic privacy.

==== Laos ====
A small study in a rural area in Laos (Savannakhet) found that menstruation is considered taboo and shameful. This creates difficulties in sharing knowledge at school and at home. Also, there is a low level of menstrual hygiene management. This has a negative effect on social opportunities in achieving good health, moving around freely and going to school. Some menstruating women (16%) wear double-layer skirts (sinhs) while in the private sphere, compared to 54% who wear disposable pads.

==== India ====
In most of India, menarche is celebrated as a positive aspect of a girl's life. For example, in Andhra Pradesh, girls who experience their menstrual period for the first time are given presents and celebrations to mark the occasion. In South Indian tradition, the first period is celebrated as a rite of passage in the Ritu Kala Samskaram.

In some traditions in central and north India, girls and women face restrictive taboos relative to menstruation, such as being denied entry to the kitchen or eating meals separately from their families. In areas around the Jhabua district of Madhya Pradesh, the belief is that "menstruation is a disease and not a normal biological process", and therefore women who are menstruating are not allowed to sleep on beds, enter kitchens, touch male members of their family or eat spicy foods.

In a 2014 study conducted in India, the researchers found that as many as 42% of women who participated in the study did not know about sanitary pads or the anatomical origin of their menstruation. The researchers noted that women reused old rags to deal with their menstrual discharge, and that "Most of them were scared or worried on first menstruation." 88% of menstruating women in rural India use alternatives to sanitary pads such as old fabric, rags, sand, ash, wood shavings, newspapers and hay.

A study conducted in six villages Uttar Pradesh in 2018 found that 87% of women had no knowledge of what a period was until their first menstruation experience and most men also did not have any idea what it involved until they got married.

==== Keddasa ====
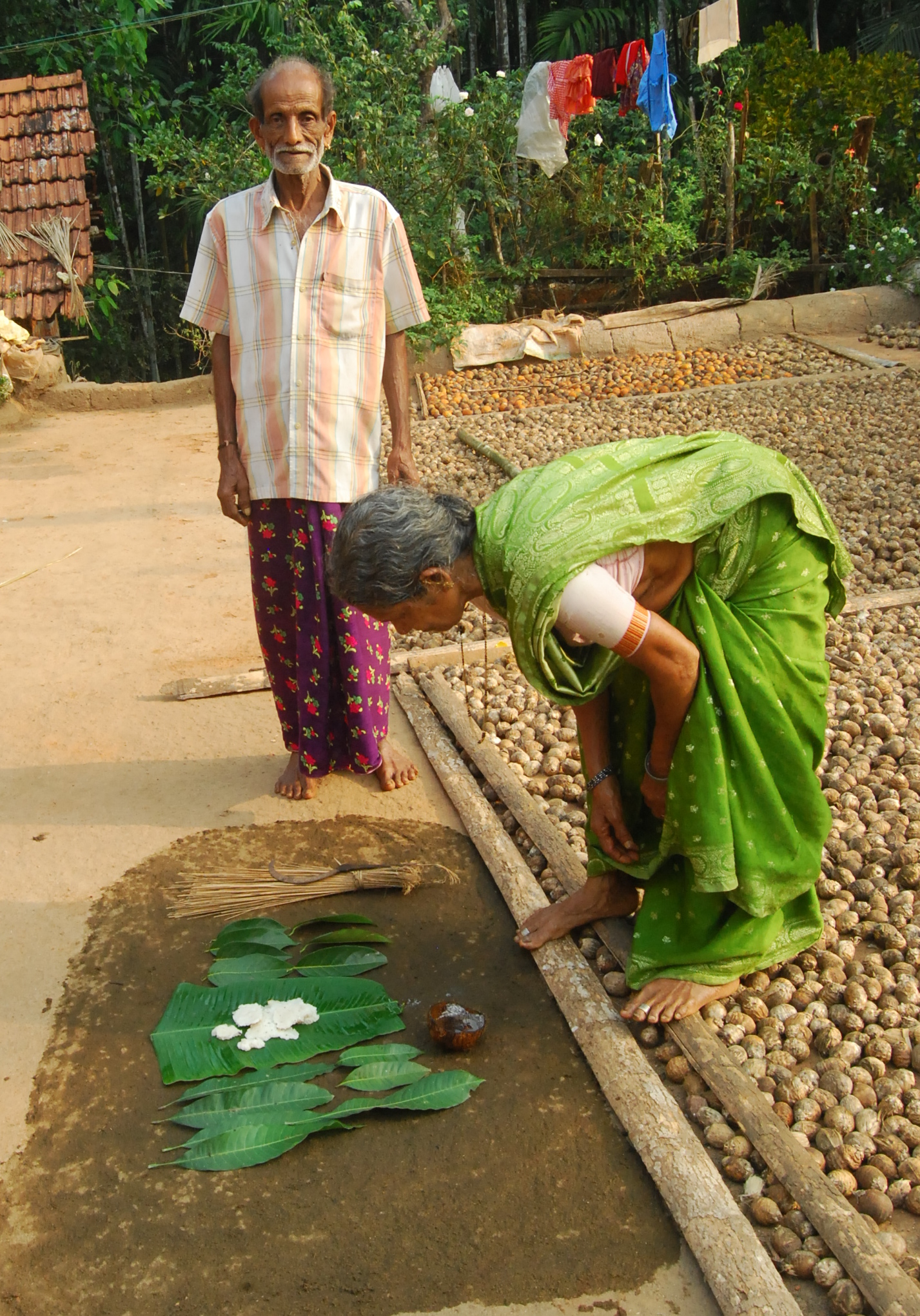
Keddaso - Menstruation of Mother Earth celebration in Tulunadu, Karnataka

Keddaso (also transliterated Keddasa, and also known as Bhumi Puje, and in Tulu as keḍḍasa ಕೆಡ್ಡಸ), is popularly known as the "festival of worshipping Mother Earth" in the Tulu Nadu region of Karnataka in South India. It is believed that on this day, Bhoomi Devi undergoes menstruation and the day is celebrated holistically in Tulu Nadu. This is an important four-day festival celebrated in the closing days of the Tulu month Ponny (Gregorian month of February).

==== Lingaraja Temple ====
Sanctity of the Lingaraja Temple is maintained by disallowing menstruating women, as well as dogs, unbathed people, and families that encountered birth or death in the preceding 12 days.

==== Sabarimala Temple ====
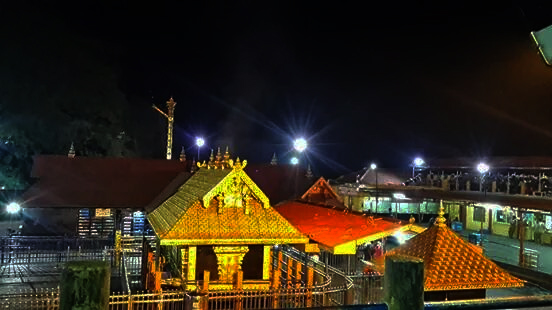
Women between 10 and 50 years of age were legally banned from entering Sabarimala between 1991 and 2018.

Sabarimala Temple is situated at Sabarimala in Pathanamthitta District, Kerala. Women of reproductive age were not permitted to worship there; the ban was said to be out of respect to the celibate nature of the deity to whom it is dedicated, Shasta, an underage teenage male. A Kerala high-court judgement had legalized this interpretation, and forbade women from entering the temple since 1991. In September 2018, a judgement of the Supreme Court of India ruled that all Hindu pilgrims regardless of gender can enter. The Constitution bench of the Supreme Court held that any exception placed on women because of biological differences violates the Constitution – that the ban violates the right to equality under Article 14. This verdict led to protests, demonstrations and violence by millions of Ayyappa devotees (both male and female) supported by the Hindu right-wing Bharatiya Janata Party and opposed by the LDF led state government. About ten women attempted to enter Sabarimala, despite threats of physical assault, but failed to reach the sanctum sanctorum. Defying such protests, two women activists belonging to the previously barred age group associated with the ruling Communist Party of India (Marxist) finally entered the temple through the rear gate, on the early hours of 2 January 2019, with the help of police and local administration. When this alleged action was brought to the notice of the temple priests and authorities, the temple was closed for ritual purification. Controversy regarding the implementation of this verdict continues.

==== Ambubachi Mela in the Kamakhya Temple ====
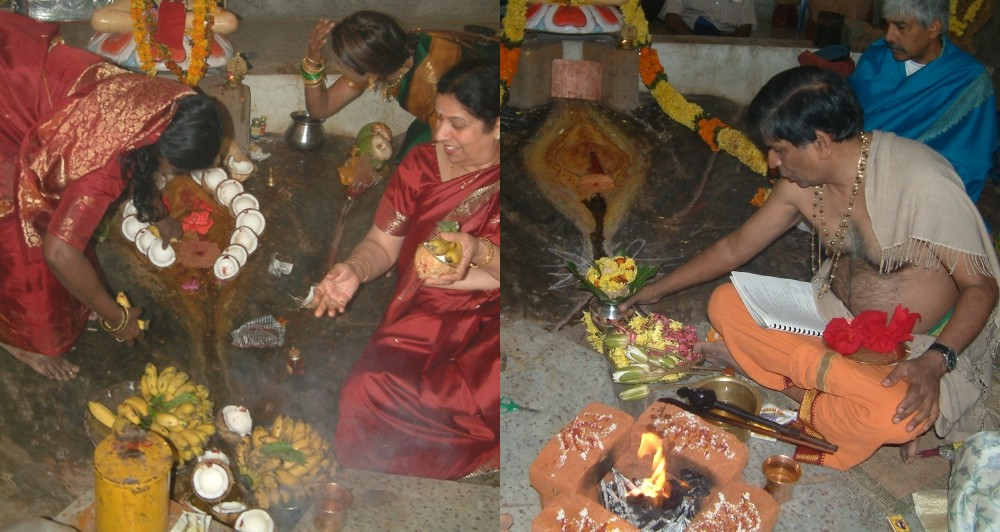
Kamakhya Puja festival

Assamese and Bengali Hindus adhering to Shaktism celebrate the menstruation of the goddess Kamakhya during the Ambubachi Mela (অম্বুবাচী), an annual fertility festival held in June, in Kamakhya Temple, Guwahati, Assam, India. The temple stays closed for three days and then reopens to receive pilgrims and worshippers. It is one of the most important pilgrimage sites in India, attracting millions of visitors each year, particularly for Ambubachi Mela which draws upwards of 100,000 pilgrims per day during the four-day festival. Before the temple is closed for Ambubachi, a white cloth is placed over the yoni (vulva)-shaped stone in which the goddess Kamakhya is worshipped in the temple. At the end of Ambubachi, when the temple is reopened and Ambubachi Mela is held, the assembled devotees are provided with fragments of that cloth, now reddened to signify menstrual blood. This cloth, known as Raktobostro (रक्तवस्त्र), is considered especially holy by Hindus since it has been stained by the 'menstrual blood' of Kamakhya, the Mother of the Universe.

==== Indonesia ====
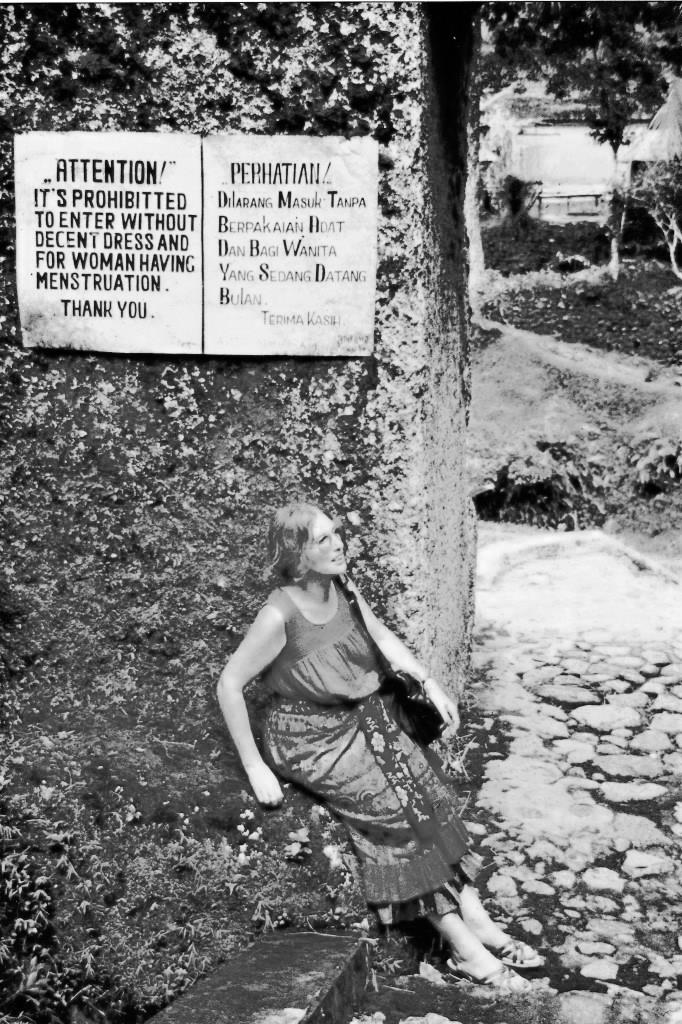
Sign reading: "It's prohibited to enter without decent dress and for woman having menstruation", Bali, 1979

In Bali, a woman is not allowed to enter the kitchen to perform her usual duties, nor is she allowed to have sex with her husband while menstruating. She is to sleep apart from the family and has to keep her clothes that she wears while menstruating away from any clothes that she could wear to the temple. One of the most important regulations is that a woman is not allowed to attend temple while menstruating. Menstruating women are restricted from cooking, having sex, entering a Hindu temple or touching certain objects that belong to men.

In Sumba, women keep their cycles secret, which makes men see them as deceitful. Women from Sumba believe that because of their secrecy, they will always have control of the men. "Men will never know how much we really can do to control these things. We have all kinds of secrets, and they should always believe that we can control even more than we really can".

Women are supposed to avoid intercourse while menstruating. It is believed that sexually transmitted diseases are the results of women deceiving men and having intercourse while they are menstruating. Gonorrhea translates as 'disease you get from women' in Sumba; it has become a social problem. When a man gets this disease, the only way it is believed he can rid himself of the painful sores is to pass it to a woman. The reasoning is that a woman's body can absorb infection and purge it during a cycle.

==== Nepal ====
Hindus in Nepal traditionally keep women isolated during menstruation; women who are menstruating are not allowed in the household for a period of three nights. This practise was banned by the Nepalese Supreme Court in 2005 but still continues. Community and organizational actions exist to combat the practice. In January 2019, local authorities demanded the destruction of chhaupadi huts in Bajura, the municipality in which a woman and her two young sons died in a hut. This resulted in the removal of 60 sheds, and the deployment of law enforcement to patrol for further removal.

Yet, despite laws criminalizing these huts and activists calling for the same, communities still continue to use them. For these communities, these huts 'menstrual huts' are spaces for contemplation, relaxation and spiritual renewal for menstruating women. In essence, the continuity of this practice demonstrates the need to consider the multiple voices and perspectives aimed at seeking effective ways to address the restrictions, and dangers, of some menstrual taboos.

==== Sri Lanka ====
According to a 2018 study, two-thirds of girls in Sri Lanka received no information about menstruation before reaching puberty. The lack of education leads to many girls getting sick due to being ill-informed about their bodies and menstrual cycles. In addition, at least one-third of girls missed school during their periods due to a lack of accessible toilets or pads.

There is also a ritual surrounding young girls, which starts with their first menstruation and ends with them receiving soft sex education. Throughout this ritual the girl can not be left alone and must always have another girl with her. If that girl must be away, she leaves an iron axe to prevent spirits from trying to influence the girl in the ritual. This part of the process continues for three months after the completion of the majority of the ritual, meaning the girl is potentially a woman before she receives any education on sex.

=== United States ===
Traditionally, the Yurok in North America practiced menstrual seclusion. Yurok women used a small hut near the main house. Menstruation among the Yurok of Northern California also varied by social class and status, with aristocratic women celebrating their periods with ten days of rituals that accrued prestige to them by heightening spiritual powers, while women who identified as commoners lacked the same privilege. The variations of menstrual experiences as defined by power structures and local value systems demonstrates the existence of multi-layered perspectives on menstruation across various societies, and which should be recognized in the conduction of any menstruation enquiry.

A survey conducted in 1981 showed that a substantial majority of U.S. adults and adolescents believed that it is socially unacceptable to discuss menstruation, especially in mixed company. Many believed that it is unacceptable to discuss menstruation even within the family. Studies in the early 1980s showed that nearly all girls in the United States believed that girls should not talk about menstruation with boys, while more than one-third of girls did not believe it appropriate to discuss menstruation with their father.

A 2018 survey of 1,500 women in the US showed that 60% of women feel embarrassed when they menstruate.

=== United Kingdom ===
In 2017, Scottish MSP Monica Lennon began work to present an 'Ending Period Poverty' bill to government. In 2019 it was officially lodged and debated in Holyrood. It was approved in November 2020 and made Scotland the first country in the world to make it a legal requirement for period products to be available for free to anyone who needs them.

In 2019, the Government Equalities Office launched a Period Poverty Taskforce to research and end the problem of people who cannot afford menstrual products.

== Society and culture ==
=== Education ===
Menstruation education is frequently taught in combination with sex education in the US, although one study suggests that girls would prefer their mothers to be the primary source of information about menstruation and puberty. A Nigerian study showed the following breakdown in menstruation education: "parents of 56%, friends of 53%, books of 46%, teachers of 44%, internet of 45%, and health centers of 54%" held the most influence in terms of menstruation education. Information about menstruation is often shared among friends and peers, which may promote a more positive outlook on puberty.

The quality of menstrual education in a society determines the accuracy of people's understanding of the process. This is in part due to the segregation of male and female peers during educational sessions. Failure to teach an accurate understanding of menstruation to students of all genders has social implications for gendered relationships and the objectification of women's bodies. Discomfort arises when students do not have access to the same information, reinforcing the belief "that menstruation is gross and should be kept hidden". Girls are encouraged to conceal the fact that they may be menstruating in order to be considered desirable. Sexual harassment and teasing about menstruation cause girls anxiety as they must struggle to ensure that they give no sign of menstruation.

Effective educational programs are essential to providing children and adolescents with clear and accurate information about menstruation. Several education and sexual health experts have studied the key features necessary for such programs. Some experts maintain that schools are an appropriate place for menstrual education to take place because they are an institution that young people attend consistently. Schools are intended to expand students' knowledge and thus serve as an appropriate site for conveying menstrual education.

Other experts argue that programs led by peers or third-party agencies are more effective than those taught in the school classroom. This may be due to the use of small group interactions, the ability of these programs to target specific populations, or the possibility that many teenagers choose to participate voluntarily in these programs, rather than being mandated to attend school programs.

=== Advertising ===
Menstrual product advertising began in the early twentieth century. Early ads included print magazine campaigns from Tambrands Inc (Tampax), Kimberly-Clark (Kotex) and brands that have since been discontinued. Advertising for menstrual products outside the US began somewhat later. In Norway, SABA began openly advertising after the Second World War, driving a brightly colored bus around the country to provide information to consumers.

Historically, menstrual product advertising has had to balance frankness and information with taboos and censorship laws against discussing or showing menstrual themes. Educational pamphlets and school outreach has been an important way of marketing to young consumers during the twentieth century.

One common way that sanitary-product advertising avoids depicting menstruation is by pouring a blue, rather than red, liquid on the sanitary product to demonstrate its absorption. Historically, this has been due to strict censorship rules regarding menstrual product advertising.

Courteney Cox appeared in a 1985 Tampax ad notable for making her the first person to use the word "period" in an American television commercial.

In 2010, the Always feminine hygiene brand created the first feminine hygiene ad to ever feature a tiny red spot, representing blood. The ad was created by intern and artist William Chyr who was working at Always' advertising agency, Leo Burnett. Originally the ad was created for the intern's personal portfolio, but then it caught the attention of the chief creative officer at Leo Burnett, and was subsequently published as an actual ad. There was some controversy when the ad was first released. In June 2016 the presence of red blood in a UK Bodyform commercial was greeted with approval in social media for its attempt to challenge the stereotypical menstruation ad, by showing women who struggle despite bleeding from cuts, blows and bruises they receive while playing various sports. Later, Bodyform's owner, Essity, launched campaigns featuring blood-like liquid in the campaign "Blood Normal".

==== Advertising for menstrual products as a purveyor of menstrual stigma ====
While menstrual products have helped women and girls all over the world better manage their reproductive health, feminists and women's rights activists have actively critiqued the production and advertising of menstrual products arguing that they have structured menstruation as a problem to be managed, hidden and suppressed in secrecy using commercial menstrual products rather than a normal biological process. Advertisements for menstrual products have actively communicated the taboos associated with menstruation by emphasizing secrecy, avoidance of embarrassment and freshness. Advertisements for menstrual products use allegories such as flowers and hearts, light colors such as blue rather than red, hence euphemistically communicating secrecy and view of menstruation as a curse to be hidden. As such, advertisements for menstrual products prey on the fear of menstruating women on being discovered menstruating because discovery means stigma. Consequently, menstrual products are advertised and made as to not be visible under one's clothes, or absorb all fluids and odors, be small enough to carry around unobtrusively and easy to discard without noticibility. By design, this is meant to ensure that menstruating women are able to keep their menstruating status secret, and thus escape the stigma that comes with discovery.

When advertisers use words such as "fresh" and "untainted" in describing the advantages that women might gain from using their products, women consequently adopt many of the themes in the advertisements with regard to menstruation. British women who were questioned about their experiences with menstruation echoed many of the themes in the advertisements reporting being self-conscious of menstruation, preferring tampons because they were less noticeable than pads, believed that menstrual blood is distasteful and finally supported the taboo against sex during menstruation. Indeed, the stigma associated with menstruation does affect how women view themselves, making them feel self-conscious during menstruation and motivated to conceal their menstrual status as a consequence of the negative attitudes and stigmatized status of menstruating women. As such, these advertisements and the design of menstrual products communicate the idea of menstruation as a polluting and dirty phenomenon, even among menstruating women themselves, despite the advantages that modern menstrual products offer women and girls with regard to their sexual and reproductive rights.

=== Visual arts ===
Menstrual art engages with menstrual themes, including blood, pain, menopause and menstrual stigma. Although not new in the twentieth century, a noted increase in artistic engagement began in the late 1960s, at the time of second-wave feminism, with artists including Shigeko Kubota, Carolee Schneemann, Judy Clark, Judy Chicago, Catherine Elwes, Marina Abramović, Gina Pane, Ana Mendieta, and later Orlan. Since the 1960s, artists have continued to take an interest in menstrual art. Menstrual art highlights different issues regarding activism around shame, menstrual creativity, feminine power, taboos and pain. Several South Asian artists including Anish Kapoor, Rah Naqvi and Lyla FreeChild have been working in different mediums such as acrylics, embroidery and menstrual blood.

In 2015, artist Rupi Kaur was censored by Instagram for posting menstrual art series Period. Kaur critiqued Instagram's position, writing: "Thank you Instagram for providing me with the exact response my work was created to critique.... I will not apologize for not feeding the ego and pride of misogynist society that will have my body in an underwear but not be okay with a small leak, when your pages are filled with countless photos/accounts where women ... are objectified, pornified, and treated [as] less than human". She also questioned why Instagram was so keen 'to help keep the public safe from periods.

Instagram later reversed their decision, and menstrual art has since flourished on the platform.

Art history has recently begun to explore this theme in art, drawing on a longer historiography of gender and the body in modern and contemporary art explored by feminist art historians, activists, feminists and academics for example Farah Ahamed. , Ruth Green-Cole, Camilla Mørk Røstvik, Kathy Battista, and Bee Hughes. In 2022 through a QR code in a book, Indian classical dance was explored as a form of menstrual art, where the dancer Amna Mawaz Khan expressed the feminine power she felt during menstruation while also rejecting period shaming and patriarchy through strong, gestural movements based on traditional dance steps to raag music, and red paint on her feet. This is the first time in modern times that a menstrual experience has been depicted in a South Asian dance, Raqs-e-Mahvaari.

The 2015 conference of the Society for Menstrual Cycle Research sponsored a group exhibition, curated by artist Jen Lewis, which resulted in a catalogue. In 2020, Norwegian museum Telemark Kunstsenter held an exhibition about menstruation named SYKLUS.

More recently, menstrual art has expanded to encompass ecological, biomedical, and posthuman perspectives. In their article in Body, Space & Technology on the technology of menstrual cups, artist Jatun Risba examines menstrual blood as a material embedded in ecological, metabolic, technological, and political structures rather than solely as a cultural symbol of stigma or femininity, situating it within eco-feminist and new materialist discourses. In their artistic practice, Risba employs menstrual blood alongside liquid chlorophyll to foreground the agency of living fluids and to interrogate the ideological systems and discourses that govern both bodies and environments. Their work critiques the capitalist medicalization, commodification, and sanitization of life, exposing how contemporary hygienic, economic and techno-scientific regimes reify and control living matter.

In parallel, Canadian artist WhiteFeather Hunter works with menstrual fluid and reproductive materials in bioart and tissue-engineering contexts as part of a techno-feminist practice that critically engages with scientific biocultures and the material agency of bodily fluids. Hunter's projects, including those developed within The Witch in the Lab Coat, employ menstrual serum and stem cells in experimental laboratory settings to challenge conventional scientific narratives and to extend feminist artistic engagement with biological matter.

=== Films, TV, books ===
Movies and television also reflect the taboo nature of menstruation. Typically menstruation as a topic is avoided, except for scenes involving menarche, a girl's first period. For example, as Elizabeth Arveda Kissling explains in her article, "On the Rag on Screen: Menarche in Film and Television", the 1991 film My Girl contains a scene where the main character, Vada, experiences her first period. The explanation given to her by a female role model of what is happening to her is done off-camera and the subject is never mentioned again, save when Vada pushes Thomas across the porch telling him, "Don't come back for five to seven days."

In an article for Vulture examining the history of menstruation depictions on screen, critic Tina Charisma wrote, "Periods have traditionally been used as symbols in storytelling, usually to signal a character's coming of age and often accompanied by disgust, fear, or shame. While there's nothing inherently wrong with that narrative, over time it's built a subconscious image of how menstruation should be orchestrated and perceived. Very rarely is a period portrayed as what it is like for almost everyone who experiences it — mundane."

In the 1976 horror film Carrie, the title character has her first period in high school, and becomes hysterical in the gym shower believing she is dying. The other girls tease her by throwing tampons and sanitary pads at her. The gym teacher tries to calm Carrie down, and eventually must explain the concept of menstruation to Carrie (because Carrie's mother had never done so). When Carrie returns home, announcing that she is a woman and inquiring why she was never told about periods, her fanatically religious mother yells at her and locks her into a closet, fearing that menstruation will bring men and the sin of sex. Later in the movie, her classmates mock her ignorance of menarche again by pouring pig's blood on her at the prom. Critics noted that the period scene "is intentionally gory, traumatic, and horrific" and mirrors the cultural "perception of menstruation as something gross and embarrassing".

The 1979 novel Endless Love by Scott Spencer has a 20-page love scene in which menstrual blood is no barrier to the obsessive union of the couple.

In the 1991 Japanese animated film Only Yesterday, one of the girls is found to be going through menstruation and is later teased about it, especially when a group of boys tell the others not to touch a ball she had touched by saying, "You'll catch her period".

Clueless, the 1995 cult classic teen movie, contains an oft-cited line about periods. Protagonist Cher, when receiving a second tardy for being late to class, uses the euphemism of "riding the crimson wave" as her reason for receiving her second tardy.

In the 2007 movie Superbad, Seth discovers menstrual blood on his jeans after dancing with a woman. He reacts with disgust, as do other men in the scene. The scene has been described by critics as "[encapsulating] the attitudes of disgust and shame associated with periods."

Netflix's Big Mouth features Jessi Glaser, played by Jessi Klein, getting her period for the first time on a school trip to the Statue of Liberty in season one episode two. As Jessi frets in the bathroom her male friend, Andrew Glouberman, played by comedian John Mulaney, finds her a menstrual product.

The 2018 Bollywood comedy-drama Pad Man was inspired by the life of social activist Arunachalam Muruganantham. As a newlywed, he wishes to help his wife get better access to sanitary products after finding out that she has to live in separate quarters during her period. He works hard in order to create a low-cost pad accessible to every woman in India. His journey was chronicled by Twinkle Khanna in her fictional story The Legend of Lakshmi Prasad.

The 2020 film Borat Subsequent Moviefilm features a scene that uses humor and irony to subvert taboos surrounding menstruation. In the scene, Borat and his daughter Tutar do a "fertility dance" at a debutante ball, and the audience is enthusiastic about the dance until Tutar lifts her dress to reveal she is menstruating, which prompts disgust and walkouts amongst the crowds. The scene was praised by writers for its satirization of common menstruation stigmas. As said by Lindsay Wolf of Scary Mommy, since society has "been conditioned…to basically pretend that periods don't exist, putting them in the spotlight like [the film] did forces us to confront that 1) they happen, and 2) we need to get over it and stop treating girls like dainty little prizes who secretly have them."

More realistic and accurate representations of periods onscreen have increased with the number of women in production roles in TV and film, with notable examples including films The Runaways and Turning Red, and the TV series Broad City, Orange is the New Black, I May Destroy You, and Yellowjackets. Yellowjackets, a series which involves a group of female characters who must learn to survive while stranded in the wilderness, received praise for not ignoring the subject of periods in comparison to other survival dramas. In the fifth episode of season one, the series addresses the issue of the girls' periods and how they must improvise in the wild with makeshift pads.

Though Turning Red does not explicitly address menstruation, it is used as a metaphor for a girl's coming-of-age. The film sparked controversy amongst critics who thought the topic of menstruation was inappropriate to reference in a children's movie, while others disagreed and emphasized the importance of normalizing a process that is a part of growing up for girls.

The essay "Menstruation in Fiction" in the 2022 book Period Matters: Menstruation in South Asia examines the male and female authorial gaze on menstruation and how more than twenty writers from different cultures have depicted it in their writing, including Philip Roth, Milan Kundera, Stephen King, and Nurudeen Farah. According to the essay, male authors have tended to objectify and dehumanize their female protagonists when depicting them on their periods. In contrast, female authors such as Shashi Deshpande, Doris Lessing, Petinah Gappah and Bapsi Sidwa are shown to be more sympathetic in their portrayal of menstruation in their fiction, highlighting cultural, religious and socioeconomic constraints.

=== Menstrual suppression ===
With the recent FDA approval of menstrual suppression medications, researchers have begun to shift their focus to the attitudes of American women toward their periods. One study in particular found that 59% of the women they surveyed reported an interest in not menstruating every month. Of these, one-third said they were interested in not menstruating at all anymore.

Anthropologists Lock and Nguyen (2010) have noted that the heavy medicalization of the reproductive life-stages of women in the West mimic power structures that are deemed, in other cultural practices, to function as a form of "social control". Medicalization of the stages of women's lives, such as birth and menstruation, has enlivened a feminist perspective that investigates the social implications of biomedicine's practice. "[C]ultural analysis of reproduction... attempts to show how women... exhibit resistance and create dominant alternative meanings about the body and reproduction to those dominant among the medical profession."

Menstrual suppression as a form of violence against disabled girls and women

While menstrual suppression has been touted as an embodiment of bodily sovereignty and autonomy among menstruating women, menstruation has emerged as a key site for discrimination and violence against women and girls with disabilities. Despite there being international laws curtailing preventing the violence and discrimination with regard to menstruation, many governments continue to sanction sterilization and other coercive responses to the menstruation of women and girls with disabilities. In this case, forced sterilization is used as a means of menstrual management consequently violation the rights of these women and girls to consent to any medical procedure performed on them as well as their autonomy over their reproduction, contravening their rights guaranteed by the Convention on the Elimination of all Forms of Discrimination Against Women (CEDAW). As a form of menstrual control, women and girls with disabilities are subjected to various forms of sterilization including but not limited to hysterectomy, tubal ligation, and endometrial ablation.

In some instances, 'less restrictive' alternatives to sterilization, particularly menstrual suppressant drugs are used and justified on the basis that they are 'temporary' and 'non-invasive' thus rendering them subject to less legal and political scrutiny. The justification of these procedures on the premise that they do not impact significantly on the autonomy and bodily integrity of the victims ignores the fact that they are non-consensual and basically a violation of these women's and girls' rights. Essentially, these practices reflect the ableist narratives that women and girls with disabilities should conceal and control their menstruation in line with the menstrual stigma that surrounds menstruation and that since they are incapable of doing so without assistance, it is therefore unnecessary for others such as their caregivers to support them as they menstruate.

Sterilization of disabled women and girls and other non-consensual menstrual practices are sanctioned in various regions of the world including Australia, the United States, Germany, New Zealand and France.

=== Activism ===
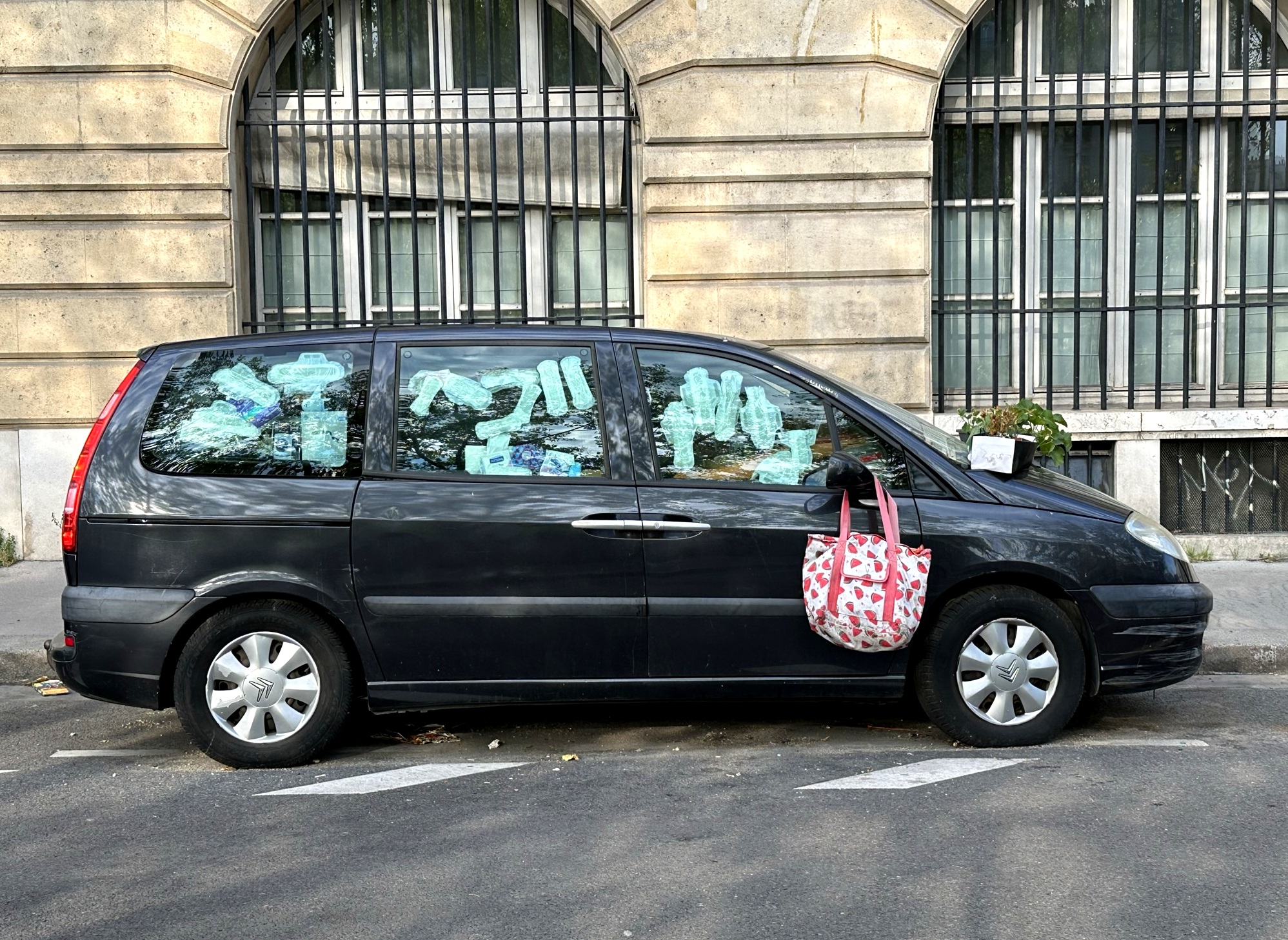
A car in Paris with menstrual pads stuck to the windows.

Menstrual activism (also known as radical menstruation, menstrual anarchy, or menarchy) is a movement that addresses menstrual stigma and tackles the social and structural ienqualities that are experienced by women and other menstruating people. Overcoming this taboo is a point of contention amongst feminists. The primary argument behind this movement is that if menstruation is normal, there is no reason why the topic should be avoided: "After a while it becomes psychologically disorienting for women to look out at a world where their reality doesn't exist."

The prominent rise of menstrual activism began with the rise of feminist spiritualist menstrual activists in the late 1960s. In 1973, a "Bleed In" was held by Janice Delaney, Mary Jane Lupton, and Emily Toth, who believed that their shared menstruation experience merited discussion. The rise of early menstrual activism was prompted by rising cases of toxic shock syndrome due to unhygienic menstrual practices, which prompted responses feminists and menstrual activists alike. As such, a group of women gathered in Boston in the spring of 1969, calling themselves the Boston Women's Health Book Collective (BWHBC). This culminated in the publishing of a manual called Women & Their Bodies, which has been adapted and currently sells today under the title of Our Bodies, Ourselves. Though the manual itself rarely discussed menstruation, it opened the floodgates for an honest criticism of the way women's health is discussed. In the following decades, women's liberationists called for pushback against the status quo. A primary vehicle for these messages was through art; in 1971, Judy Chicago created "Red Flag", a photolithograph, and a year later, an interactive art installation called "Womanhouse". Artistic expression transcended into national recognition, as evidenced by figures like Emily Culpepper. Culpepper released a short film in 1972 that featured menstruation images that detailed realities of having one's period. The fame generated from this piece made Culpepper the figure of knowledge surrounding menstruation for laypeople, and initiated her nationwide involvement with the BWHBC.

The height of second-wave feminism led to landmark changes during this period, including the establishment of the Society for Menstrual Cycle Research and literature that more directly addressed the existence of menstrual stigma.

Menstruation can be conceptualized as a stigmatized condition that both reflects and reinforces women's perceived lower status in relation to men. Feminist scholars extend this theory to explain negative attitudes towards women's bodily functions. Such stigmatization occurs when menstrual blood is viewed as one of the "abominations" of the body and reflects a gendered identity among women, which leads to consequences for women's psychological and sexual well-being.

Feminists such as Chella Quint have spoken against the use of shaming in advertising for feminine hygiene products. She created a zine, Adventures in Menstruating, to "help alter the visibility of menstruation, so that it's at least normal to talk about it. Because, right now, it's not". Other menstrual activists include Rachel Kauder Nalebuff, who published My Little Red Book; filmmaker and academic Giovanna Chesler, who created the documentary Period: The End of Menstruation; and artist Ingrid Berthon-Moine, who exhibited a video and series of photographs at the Venice Biennale.

Menstruation activism has also begun to emerge in China in recent years. Starting with the outbreak of COVID-19 in China, a grassroots movement provided free sanitary pads to diverse groups of women in China and aims to remove the stigma of menstruation. Starting by donating menstrual products to female frontline health workers in Wuhan in February 2021, the movement features the wider discussion sparked by the hashtag "package-free sanitary pads" on social media platform Weibo in September 2021 and reveals the unspeakable pain of period poverty to the public. Following the campaign by the advocacy group Stand By Her on social media, university students set up "sanitary pad help boxes" and provide free sanitary pads at over 250 campuses in China.

At 16 years old, Nadya Okamoto founded the organization PERIOD, and wrote the book Period Power: a Manifesto for the Menstrual Movement.

New York Congresswoman Grace Meng has been a longstanding advocate for menstrual equity, and proposed the Menstrual Equity for All Act of 2021 to Congress. Many women's rights organizations have endorsed this bill, including the Alliance for Period Supplies, Plan, Girls Inc., Human Rights Watch, and I Support the Girls in addition to their various campaigns that fight for destigmatization, free menstrual products, and more.

Activism roles have also been taken on by young Black women like the Brown sisters, who founded the organization 601 For Period Equity in response to the "white-washed" nature of many other organizations.

In India and Pakistan, grass roots activism is taking place with young people coming together to break the stigma around menstruation using art workshops, murals and street theatre. For example, in Jharkhand young people painted a mural on a wall outside a post office to raise awareness in the village, many social enterprises have been established to help increase access to refugee populations, people with disabilities and other marginalised groups.

=== Medicine ===
Blood from female menstruation has been used in medicines. In Chinese Daoist alchemy, menstrual blood from females who had not had sexual intercourse was used to make a substance to prolong an individual's life, called red lead (Chinese: 红铅; pinyin: hóng qiān). The substance was taken by the Ming dynasty Jiajing Emperor and the abuses inflicted on the palace women to ensure the blood's purity led to the Renyin palace rebellion.

=== Menstrual synchrony ===
Menstrual synchrony is an alleged process whereby women who begin living together in close proximity experience their menstrual cycle onsets (the onset of menstruation or menses) becoming more synchronized together in time than when previously living apart. A 2013 review concluded that menstrual synchrony likely does not exist. In an interview with a woman who was incarcerated for many years in Pakistan, she claimed that her cycle was always in sync with her fellow inmates.

=== Menstruation products ===
Menstrual products are part of menstrual culture, as they are prominent in shops, through advertising and through disposal methods (such as sanitary bins and bags). Throughout the twentieth-century applicator tampons like Tampax (Always) and pads such as Kotex were increasingly popular in the Global North.

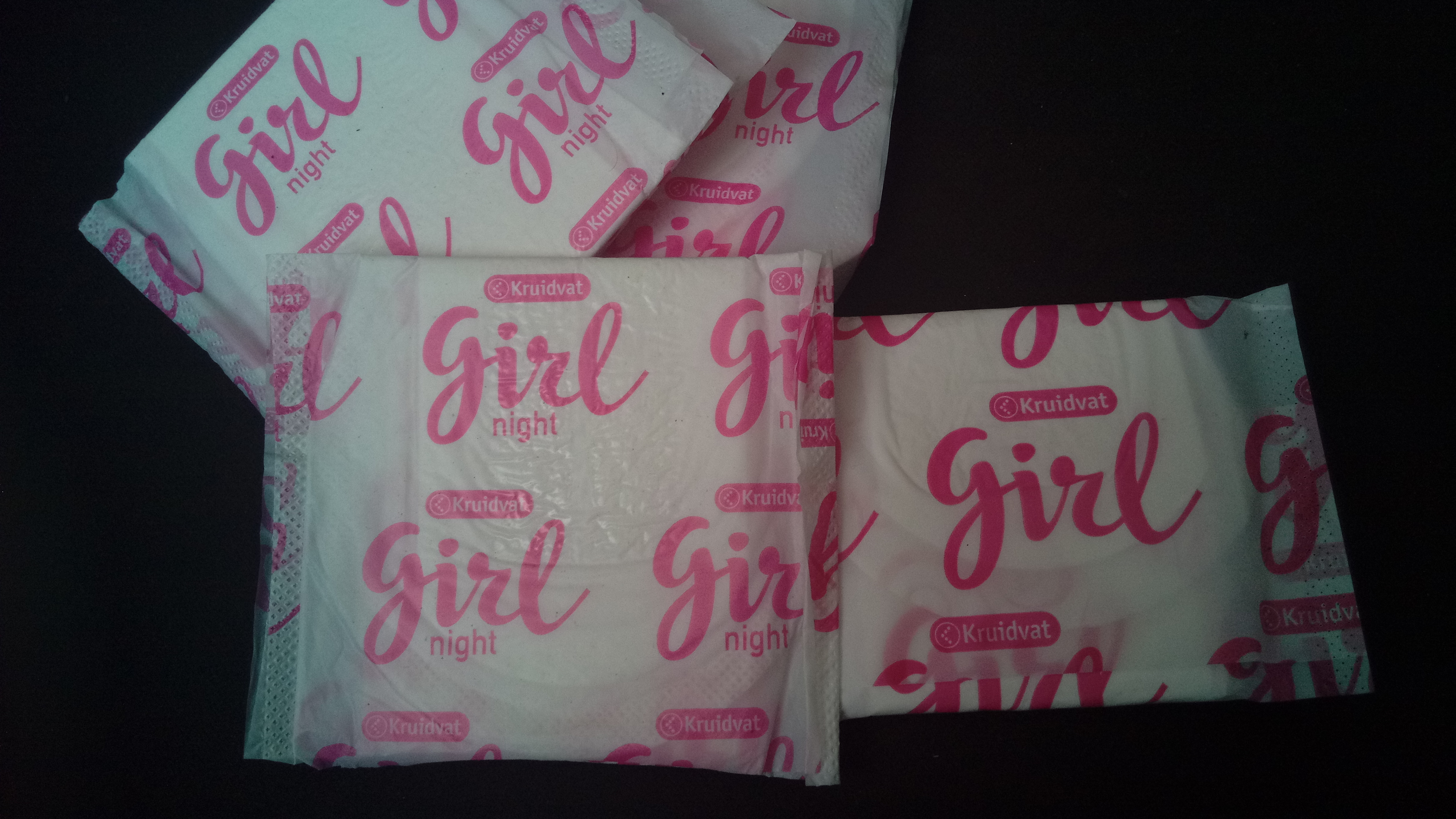
Menstrual pads

There are environmental costs of using menstruation products containing plastic and chemicals. As an alternative, companies are manufacturing reusable period panties, cloth menstrual pads, menstrual cups, biodegradable sanitary napkins and other eco-friendly products. Not all cultures use menstrual products, opting instead for natural materials or homemade options.

=== Gardening ===
Research has shown that access to sanitation and hygiene arrangements for menstruating allotment holders in the UK limits access to these spaces.

== Menstrual inequity ==
The term menstrual inequity refers to the disparities in affordability, accessibility, destigmatization, and safety of menstrual products. Furthermore, calls for menstrual equity expand into demands for reproductive justice, which includes the subtopics of education, support systems, and healthcare. Menstruation is a highly stigmatized biological process, to the extent that most women feel uncomfortable discussing their experiences. In the CBSN documentary "Period", New York Congresswoman Grace Meng discussed the complex feelings of shame that come with menstruation and how it contributes to gender inequality.

Beyond the perpetuation of gender inequality, the inclination to hide menstruation experiences contributes to the phenomenon of period poverty. Period poverty is defined as "a lack of access to menstrual products, education, hygiene facilities, waste management, or a combination of these", according to Medical News Today. In fact, 25% of women cannot purchase period products due to income limitations. Furthermore, period products cannot be purchased with government subsidies like food stamps, health spending allowances, Medicaid, or health insurance.

=== Socioeconomic inequity ===
Menstruating is an expensive process, and thus difficulty in accessing period products disproportionately impacts low-income people. Especially with laws like the tampon tax and the lack of free menstrual products in most bathrooms, many are forced to miss school or work due to lack of access. One in five low-income women have reported missing work, school or similar events due to lack of access to period supplies.

With regard to mental health, 68.1% of women experiencing monthly period poverty expressed that they were experiencing moderate or severe depression compared to 43.4% of women who experienced no period poverty.

In 2021, 51% of female students wore period products for longer than recommended. Overtime use of period products may lead to the onset of toxic shock syndrome, in addition to the chances of used pads and tampons having the ability to carry STIs. In a different study with low-income women, 64% of participants explained that they could not afford menstrual products in the previous year. Of these women, around one-third expressed that they resorted to other products like rags, toilet paper, and children's diapers.

The COVID-19 pandemic has only exacerbated these concerns in a time when unemployment and financial insecurity has risen. In March 2020, the CARES Act allowed for money from health savings and flexible spending accounts to be used for the purchasing of menstrual products. Interviews with poor women in Pakistan conducted during the pandemic highlight how access to menstrual products became impossible and was not a priority and they had to resort to sharing and using rags.

In 2017, the U.S. Department of Justice promised to grant every woman incarcerated in a federal prison menstrual products free of charge. Yet countless women are not housed in a federal prison, and go without access to period products keeping them safe and hygienic. 54% of women in prisons do not have access to sufficient period supplies, as they are forced to spend their 75 cent per hour wages at commissaries that charge up to 5 dollars for pads and tampons.

Efforts are now being made to reduce period poverty in Scotland, as it became the first country in the world to make period products free in August 2022. The Period Products Act made it a legal duty for local authorities to provide free period products such as tampons and sanitary pads to "anyone who needs them."

=== Racial inequity ===
Like many other health-related concerns, menstruators' experiences are influenced by their race, amongst other factors. Medical racism extends to discussions of period pain as well.

Dismissal of period pain is further implicated by the history of violence against black women, originating with slavery and continuing into its aftermath. Dr. J. Marion Sims, who is heralded as the father of obstetrics and gynecology, performed risky surgeries without anesthesia on enslaved women in order to experiment. A study performed through a series of interviews highlighted that for black and Latina women, all the women in the study reported a normalization of pain by medical professionals. This was not surprising to the author of the study, given that women are proven to be less likely to report their pain when they are shot down in their attempts to seek out help. Women in the study expressed atypical symptoms such as 47-day-long periods, excruciating cramps, and unrelenting constipation—and still were dismissed by medical professionals. These women, up to multiple decades later, were diagnosed with severe illnesses like pituitary tumors and polyendocrine metabolic ovarian syndrome (PMOS). The denial of pain for women of color does not stop at delayed diagnoses and daily pain, and rather has larger implications for mental health. A strong case has been made by some Marxist feminists for including period leave in the work place citing pain as one of the reasons while many other feminists are against it.

Negative relations and perceptions of one's uterus and uterine functions potentially may make many hesitant to call on their reproductive system in the future. Especially considering high black maternal mortality rates, the connection between poor relationships with reproductive health and adverse consequences is glaring.

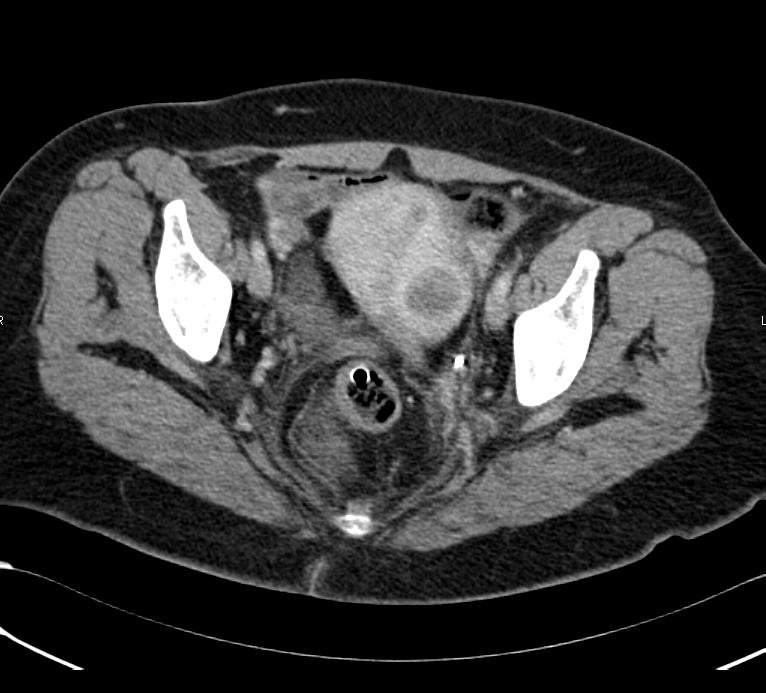
A CAT scan of a uterine fibroid

Fibroids are a particularly important condition to mention when discussing racial disparities in menstrual health. Uterine fibroids are significantly more likely to occur in black women, with 9 out of 10 black women being diagnosed with fibroids before the age of 50. Black women also face higher rates of adverse symptoms, like extreme pain and heavy menstrual bleeding. Impacts on black women are further worsened by the fact that 42 percent of black women wait four years or more before seeking out treatment for fibroids, compared to 29 percent of white women. Fibroids have immense consequences in terms of cancer risk, as black women who have fibroids have shown to be 40 percent more likely to have some form of endometrial cancer. Analogously, it has been demonstrated that black women are equally as likely to have endometriosis, but are significantly less likely to be diagnosed with the disease compared to white women.

All of the aforementioned health risks result in what physicians and activists alike label as "period trauma". Dr. Charis Chambers, a board certified OB/GYN, explains that "I would define period trauma as any sustained psychological, social, or emotional injury/distress related to or caused by menstruation". Almost half of black school-attending women reported that they are not able to do their best on school work because of their periods. Especially considering the additional systemic burdens faced by black people, missing school and becoming further behind in the system worsens phenomena like the wage gap between white and black women.

=== Transgender people ===
66 percent of trans men feel uncomfortable or unsafe using their preferred restroom. Correspondingly, 66% of transgender men thought people felt negative or very negative about masculine-presenting people who menstruate.

Many trans men and trans masculine people feel uncomfortable with vaginal penetration, as penetration in itself is strongly associated with femininity and womanhood. Period poverty disproportionately affects transgender menstruators, because these populations already face poverty, unemployment, incarceration, and underemployment at much higher rates.

== Menstruation activism ==
Menstruation activism has become more prominent during third-wave feminism, with a range of arguments being made across global scholarship and cultures. Much of the menstruation activism in the West has centered on arguments against what many feminists believe to be the misuse of menstruation to 'prove' female biological inferiority. While some feminists have argued that Western patriarchy has used the inability for women to control their menstruation as evidence of the female body suffering from limitations, others have focused on historical works that deem menstrual blood 'dirtier' than other blood, because it results from the failed reproductive cycle. Activists in literary fields and gender studies have noted a history of menstruation as being symbolic for evil or secrecy, and argue against the long standing stigmatization of menstruation in order to elevate masculinity. Thus, menstrual activism has grown to include a variety of arguments, including, but not limited to: social, philosophical, political, and theoretical. All of these efforts make up the Menstrual Equity Movement, which seeks to correct menstruation as a driving force for social and political inequality.

One focus of activism has been to challenge high taxes on menstrual products, otherwise known as period tax. In recent years, activists around the world have turned their attention to lowering or abolishing the higher taxes placed on menstrual products, because some states and countries consider them "luxury items". In the US, the tax on menstrual products can reach up to 10%, depending on state legislature. In 2020, Hungary had one of the largest, taxing up to 27% on menstrual products. In Switzerland, menstrual products are taxed at a rate of 7.7% which is the same tax rate applied to cars, alcohol and watches, as opposed to other everyday items such as groceries which are taxed at 2.5%. Still, some activists have raised concerns that the focus on period tax is halting broader, more important activism, like challenging the social and medical stigma that surrounds menstruation. Still, the movement to lower period tax has persisted, and has been deeply connected to another movement against period poverty. For many menstrual activists, the call for the exemption of menstrual products from taxation is based on the unjust nature of the tax, since menstruation is a natural biological process that women have no control over whether it occurs or not. In China, the movement towards the abolishment of period tax also referred to as tampon tax continues to gain traction, with various activists on Weibo calling for the abolition of the tax by the Chinese government aided by various hashtags such as "sanitary pads tax-free" in a curious intersection of technology, digital activism and menstruation activism.

Period poverty is a recent phrase and refers to anything dealing with an impoverished menstruation experience, including the shame and stigma associated with the lack of a dignified experience as well as affordability and access to a choice of menstrual products from tampons, pads, underpants or menstrual cup, sanitation facilities with clean running water, reproductive health education, and waste management. A global study conducted in 2021 showed that roughly 500 million women and girls experience period poverty. The effects of period poverty can range from physically not being able to attend school, work, or both while menstruating, as well as negatively impact mental health. A US study conducted in 2021 showed that roughly 68% of women who reported experiencing period poverty monthly, also expressed having feelings of moderate to severe depression. This same study also revealed differences across racial lines in the US, as Latinx women reported the highest rates of period poverty, followed by Black women, and then white women, particularly from low-income communities. Although research into period poverty has focused primarily on cisgender women in low/middle income communities and countries, other scholars have begun examining how period poverty affects non-binary and transgender individuals as well.

With the rise of commodity feminism, menstruation activism has evolved from just promoting the accessibility, environmental-friendliness and affordability of menstrual products to center more critical issues with regard to menstrual products such as the manner in which menstrual products perpetuate menstrual stigma. Besides environmental concerns, menstrual activists have addressed the various ways in which the advertising and manner of production of menstrual products such as disposable pads and tampons has framed menstruation as a problem to be managed, hidden, or suppressed in private with commercial products. Consequently, menstruation activists have adopted various strategies in combatting the menstrual stigma perpetuated by menstrual products, with the use of 'alternative menstrual products' and do-it-yourself menstrual products being at the forefront. In this case, alternative menstrual products are products that are not produced by the four multinationals that dominate the menstrual products and include menstrual cups and discs, cloth pads, period underwear and organic pads and tampons in some instance. Producers of alternative menstrual products focus on the elimination of stigma around menstruation through positive and educational messages about menstruation in their marketing. They address a wide range of topics with regard to menstruation from period positivity, access to affordable and sustainable products, access to menstrual education and women's health, challenging the status quo maintained by producers of mainstream menstrual products.

== Menstrual pain and the transgender and non-binary community ==
Recent scholarship has argued that menstruation, although a strictly biological function, has been imbued with gender/sex identity. Thus, as advocacy for, and awareness of transgender and non-binary individuals increases across the globe, menstrual activism is evolving as well.

As trans men and non-binary individuals who were assigned female at birth (AFAB) may still menstruate, they often experience the same negative side-effects of menstruation, like cramping. Similarly some argue that the negative effects it may have on mental health have been underexplored. As menstruating conflicts with conventional ideas about masculinity, activists are concerned about the dysphoric gender identity that can arise from menstruating, after someone has chosen to transition or adopt a gender identity not linked to their sex at birth. Some AFAB individuals have expressed concern about the tension between menstruating and affirming their chosen gender identity. Scholars have begun arguing for a non-gendered conception of menstruation in both social and medical settings, in an attempt to alleviate the discomfort AFAB individuals feel during menstruation. Examples of this can include but are not limited to: using clinical, non-gendered language to describe menstruation, saying 'cycle' rather than 'period', or 'menstrual products' rather than 'feminine hygiene products'. Finally, researchers have also noted that many AFAB individuals who menstruate encounter barriers in public restrooms, as men's restrooms do not have sanitary disposal bins in the stalls, and there are often few cubicles in comparison to urinals. This results in AFAB individuals having to wait for access to stalls, and dispose of their menstrual products in the public waste bin. Thus, advocacy for gender-neutral bathrooms has become a more recent part of menstruation activism.

== Menstruation and technology ==
Femtech (Female Technology), a phrase coined by Ida Tin, is a subclass of technology with a core focus in women's health. Apps, devices and other technologies under the category of Femtech provide services such as tracking menstruation, fertility, pregnancy or other reproductive health issues. In regards to menstruation and fertility apps, these services often collect data about a person's period, symptoms, sexual activity or fertility. These apps provide predictions and health observations by analyzing user's data. However, the collection and access of sensitive menstrual and fertility data from users isn't regulated and serves many people across different countries who have differing cultural views about topics such as menstruation and abortion which can put users at risk.

=== Data privacy and menstrual surveillance ===
After the overturning of Roe v. Wade, the U.S. Congressional Research Service noted that personal data such as health records, financial records, geolocation information, and electronic communications may be acquired and used by law enforcement to identify and persecute the act of an abortion. Under the Health Insurance Portability and Accountability Act (HIPAA), the HIPAA Privacy Rule generally prohibits sharing an individual's identifiable health information, although exceptions can be granted under court order or warrant to provide law enforcement with identifiable health information under the premise that it will lessen a serious or imminent threat. However, many consumer health apps which only make general wellness claims do not need to comply with the HIPAA Privacy Act and may share or sell consumer data. These consumer health apps include ones that track menstruation, fertility and sexual information. Acquisition of data from either a primary collector or sold from another entity can be acquired by law enforcement to enforce local abortion laws. Concerns have been expressed especially for individuals who are Black, Indigenous and People of Color (BIPOC) or low-income who are disproportionately surveilled at higher rates.

Flo Health which offers services such as period calendars, ovulation and fertility tracker, menstrual cycle reminders etc. was charged by the Federal Trade Commission in 2021 for mishandling user data and sharing it with third parties. Members of Congress have even requested Apple and Google to remove period trackers that do not give users the ability to opt out of data collection.

=== Women's health research ===
Data from menstrual apps poses a new area of study in Women's Health research. Menstrual apps collect data on various period metrics such as bleeding, pain patterns, energy levels, mood and sexual activity. This poses as a new source of data for researchers to better understand women's health, who have historically been underrepresented in medical research. Clue also suggests that by analyzing user data it can create suggestions for users to check for health issues such as polyendocrine metabolic ovarian syndrome (PMOS) if symptoms arise in user's inputted data.

=== Application bias ===
Criticisms note that many menstrual tracking apps such as Clue, Flo, and Period Tracker reinforce prejudices by catering their designs towards cisgender, sexually active, heterosexual women through the designs of their applications, using colors, pictures or symbols that are typically associated with femininity. These apps do not account for individuals who identify with other genders and make assumptions that the user wishes to procreate or isn't infertile, providing features such as ovulation tracking, pregnancy avoidance and fertility treatment which don't account for queer, infertile or unpartnered women. Users have also complained of a lack of representation of other women's health issues in menstruation apps such as irregular cycles or menopause where predictive algorithms or features may be less precise or absent all together.

== See also ==
- Arunachalam Muruganantham (subject of the 2013 documentary Menstrual Man)
- Grandmother hypothesis
- Menophilia, colloquially menstruation fetish
- Menstrual hygiene day
- Menstruation celebration
- Chhaupadi, a menstrual taboo in Nepal
- Metaformic Theory
- Seclusion of girls at puberty
- The Story of Menstruation (1946 animated film)
- Vagina and vulva in art
- Period. End of Sentence. (2018 documentary)
