= Menstruation hut =

Room or structure for menstruating women

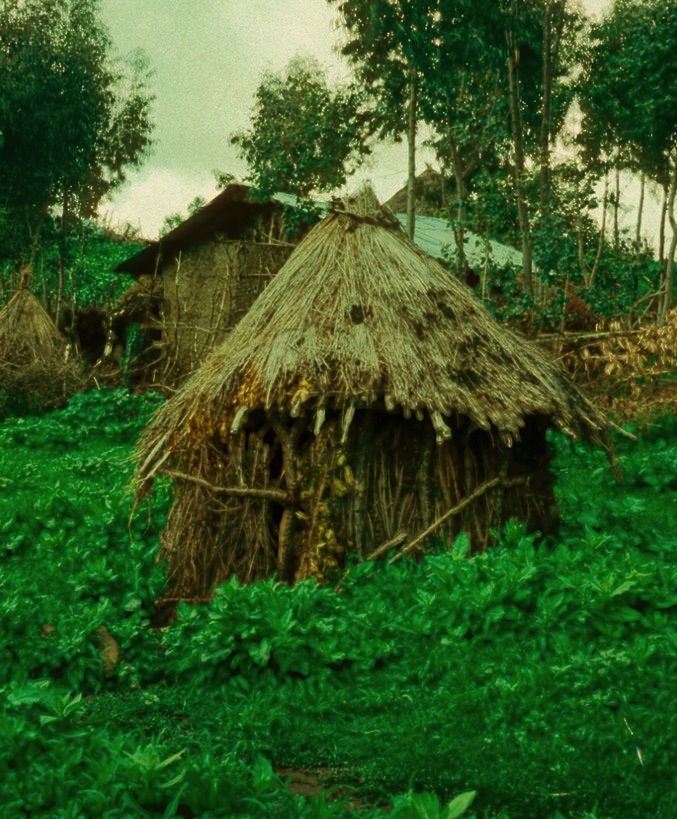
A niddah hut (Mergem Gogo) at the Jewish village of Ambober in northern Ethiopia, 1976. Beta Israeli women left their homes and stayed at the hut during menstruation, until they could ritually purify themselves at the river and return home.

A menstruation hut is a place of seclusion or isolation used by certain cultures with strong menstrual taboos. The same or a similar structure may be used for childbirth and postpartum confinement, based on beliefs around ritual impurity. These huts are usually built near the family home, have small doors, and are often dilapidated, with poor sanitation and ventilation, and no windows. The Nepali version, the Chhaupadi, is probably the best-known example, but cultural attitudes towards menstruation around the world mean that these huts exist, or existed until recently, in other places as well. The use of menstrual huts continues to be a cause of death, from exposure, dehydration, snake bite, smoke inhalation, and so on. The use of these huts is illegal in some places.

== Cultures ==
=== Use in Ethiopia among Jewish women ===
In Ethiopia's Jewish community, when a woman becomes niddah (impure during menstruation), she may remain in a niddah hut for some of the time. These huts are absent in Israel, but exist in the Ethiopian highlands, known to the Ethiopian Jewish community as margam gojos. The women must stay in the hut, usually located on the margins of the village, for seven days. Women there report negative as well as positive views on the practice. Some describe fear, cold, and lack of food, while others enjoy the social interaction, relaxation, and rest. While in these huts, the women can not cook, apart from coffee and the roasting of grain. Others may bring food to them, but while doing so they take care in avoiding physical contact.

Within the margam gojos, there are few utensils, some pieces of equipment, and some basic furniture. Stones are placed in a circular shape around the menstruation hut at a radius of one and a half meters to help distinguish between perceived impure and pure spaces. If anyone were to come into contact with the woman during their menstruation, they too would have to stay in the hut. To avoid contact, the families of the women in the margam gojos leave food outside the door.

To avoid ritually contaminating their food or drink with blood, which would render it unfit to consume, women wear leather belts under their shirts with fabric tied to them designed to stem the flow of blood. During menstruation, a woman is not allowed to go in or across rivers, as her menstrual blood would render it ritually impure. Once a woman has finished menstruating, another woman will watch her immerse in a river. There, the woman who has just finished menstruating will wash herself and the clothes she wore in the margam gojo. After she and her clothes are clean, she will change into pure clothes that have been retrieved from her home. The only time that a Jewish woman ceases going to the margam gojo is when she starts menopause, as it puts an end to the impurity.

=== Chhaupadi in Nepal ===
According to the tradition of chhaupadi, Hindu women in western Nepal reside in a small hut, called a Chhau Goth, for 5 days during menstruation. However, the tradition requires those menstruating for the first time to stay in the hut for at least 14 days. In some communities, these huts may also be used by pregnant women to deliver babies. The huts may be made of mud and stones and may have roofs made of grass. Normally, they do not have windows, and the women sleep on straw on the floor covering themselves with a thin blanket. In a Nepali survey around 2017, one district with around 49,000 households had over 500 of these huts. Although the practice of using menstruation huts was made illegal in 2005 by Nepal's supreme court, the first arrest under this legislation did not take place until 2019.

=== India ===
In many Indian states, the practice of banishing women and girls is common. It is mostly prevalent among the Gonds which are the largest tribal group in Central India and hail from the states of Maharashtra, Chhattisgarh, Andhra Pradesh and Orissa as well as Madiya ethnic groups. These shacks, known locally as "kurma ghar" or "gaokar," lack basic amenities like proper beds, clean water and functional washrooms. Since menstruating women are not permitted to cook, Gaokors lack a kitchen. Those staying inside rely on family members to bring them food and other supplies. The accountability of maintaining such huts lies on no one since they are considered as public property. These shacks are usually located on the outskirts of the village or near a forest. The unsanitary conditions coupled with unhygienic menstrual practices — many women use strips made from mahua leaves covered with paddy chaff as pads, often lead to infections, illnesses, and sometimes even death. The decrepit shacks provide little protection against wild creatures.

According to a representative of from a local NGO Sparsh, at least eight women have died in Gadchiroli alone since 2011 as a result of this forced seclusion. Some have died due to pneumonia, while others were bitten by snakes. Jayanti Baburao Gawade, a 47-year-old was made to go to the menstrual hut while she had fever and high blood pressure and was discovered dead the next morning by her family in Ettapalli, Gadchiroli district, in November 2017. During cyclone Gaja in Thanjavur district in Tamil Nadu, a 14-year-old girl who was compelled to stay in a hut outside her home because she was menstruating, was killed when a coconut tree fell on it.

In 2015, India's National Human Rights Commission called the practice as "a violation of human rights" and ordered Maharashtra to take action to end the practice. Religion and tradition are often cited as main reasons for justifying restrictions. It is believed by the people that the tradition could not be changed because "it's been decreed by our gods" and if they defied tradition, they would face the wrath of gods and invite illness and death in the family.

Many girls are forced to remain absent from school due to this practice. An estimated 23% of girls in India drop out of school when they start menstruating. This custom frequently prevents girls from taking their exams while they are menstruating. It denotes that only a few girls from regions where this practice is prevalent continue their education past matriculation.

To challenge the stigma and taboos around menstruation, various social media campaigns have been launched. The #periodforchange campaign, started by the Kachra Project, encouraged discussion on the topic. #Happytobleed is another counter-campaign to combat the sexism that women experience as a result of taboos associated with menstruation. It recognizes menstruation as a normal occurrence which doesn't need curtains to hide behind.

=== Indonesian Cultures ===
The Huaulu have strict ideas about menstruation huts. The huts are made from sago wood and sago leaf thatch. Only women can build these huts because men are not allowed near them under death penalty. The huts are built facing away from the village and there are no windows facing the village either. The huts are used for menstruation, all births, and some females and young children are allowed as well. The women often share a hut so there are usually several people in one hut at a time. Men are never welcome, but younger boys below the age of puberty are allowed, and they cannot even look in the windows.

The women must stay outside the village during menstruation, but they are free to wander the forest and surrounding areas. They cannot meet or help their husbands in any way, but they may gather their own food and amuse themselves as they please with music and stories in the hut.

During menstruation, the women are considered unclean and impure so they cannot interact with the men or be in the village. They see themselves as the saviors of men because they are able to handle their menstruation and keep the men safe and clean. The menstruating women are required to bathe in a special fountain where men were not allowed.

The Kodi keep their menstruation a secret by hiding it and not telling anyone so that they can use it as a source of female manipulation and witchcraft or natural medicine. The women are allowed to take care of all their duties during menstruation. Other women are the caretakers of those in menstruation, and they have many symbolisms, taboos, and beliefs around it involving dyes, tattoos, and rituals.

=== Others ===
In Yap (part of Micronesia), after giving birth, women and their newborn babies spend time in a menstruation hut while the father has a holiday. The Yapese women have many taboos and secrets around menstruation. They use the menstrual huts to hide themselves so that they do not embarrass themselves in front of the men. Menstrual huts were also used for childbirth and after childbirth care. The older women teach the younger women and girls skills and practices about health, especially menstruation and childbirth, as well as the other tasks which the Yapese women are required to do.

The Yurok women of California lived in menstruation huts built near the main house. The Yurok women were required to stay in a menstruation hut a short way away from the village. There is much taboo and power associated with menstruation in this culture. Those menstruating must remain in the hut and abide by certain rules or there will be consequences for her, the other women, and even the village because she holds so much power. The women are thought by many to be unclean, and anything they use is made unclean as well, but the women believe themselves to be very powerful in this time and they should not waste time on trivial tasks during menstruation.

The Páez people of the southwestern highlands of Colombia previously used menstruation huts.

== See also ==
- Menarche
- Culture and menstruation
- Seclusion of girls at puberty
- The Red Tent (Diamant novel)
