= Happy To Bleed =

Indian social movement to counter menstrual taboos and stigma

Happy To Bleed is a social movement to counter menstrual taboos and stigma in India. It was initiated by Nikita Azad (originally from Jalandhar, India), a women's rights activist and an undergraduate student of English honors at Government College Girls, Punjabi University, Patiala. Azad's real name is Nikita Arora, who is a Rhodes Scholar for 2018-2020 at the University of Oxford, UK where she will read for the MSt in Women's Studies (2019) and the MSc in History of Science, Medicine, and Technology (2020).

== History ==
On 13 November 2015, Prayar Gopalakrishnan, the Devaswom chief of the Sabarimala temple in Kerala, said that women would be allowed to enter Sabarimala after a machine has been invented to scan and judge a woman's purity in response to a question about women's entry into the temple. He said, "A time will come when people will ask if all women should be disallowed from entering the temple throughout the year. These days there are machines that can scan bodies and check for weapons. There will be a day when the machine is invented to scan if it is the 'right time' (not menstruating) for a woman to enter the temple. When that machine is invented, we will talk about letting women inside."

His statement received criticism. In response to this statement, 20-year-old Nikita Azad started the Happy To Bleed campaign on 21 November 2015. Azad and her friends started a social media campaign, posting pictures of themselves with a sanitary pad that said Happy to Bleed. The Facebook page of the campaign describes it as, "a campaign against menstrual taboos, and commodification of women's menstrual health." She wrote an open letter to Gopalakrishnan questioning his reasoning on not allowing women to enter Sabarimala.
