= Menstruation celebration =

Event celebrating menarche (first period)

A menstruation celebration, honors menarche or menstruation in general. Menstruation celebrations are held across the globe, in many different ways and for different reasons. This includes Indigenous communities in the Americas, such as the Apache, Hupa, Anishinaabe, and Amazonian Tucuna. Menstruation celebrations are also held in Japan, Africa, India, and the Ulithi Tribe from the South Pacific, as well as throughout the rest of the world.

== Asia ==
=== India ===
==== Odisha ====
The festival, Raja Parba or Mithuna Sankrati is held in Odisha. It is a four-day festival which celebrates menstruation. It starts with the beginning of monsoon season, every year, in June, and women are expected to stop chores, instead focusing on other indulgences. The first-day is called Pahili Raja, the second Mithuna Sankranti, the third Basi Raja and the last day is called Vasumati Snana. It is believed that Goddess Earth, known as Rajaswala, also menstruates during the first three days of the festival. In Odisha, women are seen as being closely connected to nature, which is why Rajaswala menstruates during this time. Prior to day of the celebration, called Sajabaja, entire house is cleaned and on the first three days of the festival the spices are ground on the grinding stone. While all the preparation is going on, women enjoy during the festival and wear new clothes, jewelry and put alta (a red/pink coloured liquid) on their feet. On the last day of the festival, women go to the grinding stone and bathe in turmeric. The festival is completed with the ritual bath of Goddess Bhudevi.

==== Assam ====
In Assam, a popular menstruation celebration, is called Toloni Biya/ Tuloni Biya/ Nua-tulon/Santi Biya. The word Biya in Assamese means marriage, thus, Toloni Biya is a ceremonial symbolic wedding of the girl after menarche. This ceremony is celebrated with great enthusiasm, and the purpose of this celebration is to educate the girl about reproduction and the menstrual cycle. The parents of the girl and neighbours pray for the well-being of her reproductive health.

In addition to the symbolic marriage, the ceremony also secludes the girl and imposes restrictions on her movements and food preferences, such as; being brought home in a with a veil, consuming no food other than bananas, being confined to a room, and having no contact with men including family members.

Despite the celebration of menarche in Tuloni biya, it is still a practice that is relatively concealed, as young girls do not talk openly about the celebration, and the participants are secluded in a room for a section of the ceremony, as they are seen as impure by the rest of the community.

=== Japan ===
In certain regions of Japan, the onset of menses in a girl is commemorated with a family celebration involving an old traditional meal sekihan, which consists of glutinous rice and adzuki beans. The red color of the meal symbolizes celebration and joy and therefore constitutes an appropriate way to celebrate this milestone.

== North America ==
=== Apache/Ndee ===
The Ndee, or Apache, use a ceremony called the Sunrise Dance as a celebration of menarche by the Apache community in the Arizona and Mexico region of the United States. The Apache has three subtribes today, the Mescalero, Lipan, and Chiricahua, which each has its own nuances for the Sunrise Dance Ceremony. The ceremony is prepared for by the community months before it begins. The community starts preparing for this ceremony months before. A day prior to the ceremony, the girl takes a sweat bath, meanwhile the male relatives and a medicine man (a healer) make the items that will be required during the ceremony. In the evening, these items are presented to the girl.

The ceremony takes place over a period of four-days and in eight stages. During this ceremony, the girl wears the traditional Apache attire and dances, which signifies female strength. The friends and family also participate and sing traditional songs and the girl also receives a massage and the ceremonial blessing from the medicine man and other people.

=== Anishinaabe ===
In Anishinaabe culture, in the Mid-West United States, and throughout Southern Canada, Ojibwe and Algonquin girls undergo a fast from eating berries and berry products during the first year they begin their menstruation. This fast goes on for a year, after a feast in the springtime with women from the community acting as guides to womanhood for the girls. After the four seasons have passed, where the girls refrain from eating berries, a twenty-four hour fast happens, where afterwards, the girls have another feast with women from the community and are presented as new women of the community. The fast is meant to help the girls model themselves after Mother Earth, preparing them to care for and sustain the community

=== United States ===
In 2020, Parents writer Christine Michel Carter researched the celebration of first moon parties in the Black community in the United States. Most girls get their first menstrual cycle between 12 and 13 years old, according to The American College of Obstetricians and Gynecologists. The age of menstruation onset is slightly younger for Black girls due to health disparities, increased material hardship, and levels of stress. For Black girls, the first moon party is a rite of passage that instills values, principles, and knowledge of a young girls' self.

Despite the growing popularity of first moon parties in the United States, this trend is still uncommon amongst most U.S. women and girls. However, after girls receive their first period, some parents give them gifts, but it is very uncommon. In U.S. culture, menarche is approached with embarrassment and concealment, as many girls and women feel the need to hide their menstruation.

== South America ==
=== Amazon Tikuna ===
Amazonian Tikuna girls in Brazil, Colombia, and Peru receive a rite of passage of the "pelazon" upon experiencing their first menstruation. For three months to one year, they reside in isolated bedrooms within their parents' residences. They spend time studying the history, music, and religion of their people from community members. The Tikuna tribe has a lot of young members, so the festival of the pelazon happens frequently, with multiple girls being celebrated at once. On the first day of the celebration, the feast day, the participating girls are stripped naked, and washed in the Amazon River. After being covered with sap from the genipapo tree, they have their clan's symbol applied to them, as well as feathers and pollen. The girls are brought to a meeting house, where they have their hair pulled out by their female relatives. Until their hair grows back, for the next nine months, they are protected from sexual advances from young men.

The pelazon arrives at its celebratory finale when the girls are returned to society.

== See also ==
- Culture and menstruation
