= Chella Quint =

Chella Quint OBE
- Born: Brooklyn, New York, US
- Education: New York University Tisch School of the Arts; Bretton Hall College of Education
- Writing career
- Subject: Menstrual stigma
- Website: Official website

Chella Quint OBE is an American born writer, performer, and education campaigner on menstruation, based in Sheffield, England.

== Early life and education ==
Chella Quint was born in Brooklyn, New York, and earned her degree in dramatic writing from New York University's Tisch School of the Arts. She subsequently gained a place at Bretton Hall College of Education, where she completed her postgraduate certificate in education in drama education.

== Career ==
Early in her career, Quint taught drama at school, based in Sheffield during the day and performed stand-up comedy at night. In 2005 she published the first of her zines, "Adventures in Menstruating", in which she humorously explores menstrual products, sanitary bins, and blood stains.

She introduced the term "period positive" in 2006 and created #periodpositive to challenge menstrual taboos through humour while seeking solutions to period poverty. In 2019, she introduced the "Period Positive Pledge," which serves as a guideline for forming menstruation-inclusive policies and outreach programmes.

Quint published Own Your Period in 2021. In 2024 she was awarded an OBE for her contributions to the field of education.

== Selected publications ==
=== Articles ===
- Adventures in Menstruating. Issue no. 1. 2005.
- Quint, Chella (31 January 2011). "To the Leaking Girl". Women's Studies. 40 (2): 220. doi:10.1080/00497878.2011.538000. ISSN 0049-7878.

=== Books ===
- Own Your Period. words & pictures. 2021. ISBN 978-0-7112-5663-7.
- Be Period Positive: Reframe Your Thinking And Reshape The Future Of Menstruation. Dorling Kindersley Limited. 2021. ISBN 978-0-241-54177-7.
