= Blood Bowl Sutra =

The Blood Bowl Sutra (Chinese: 血盆經; pinyin: Xuèpénjīng, Japanese: Ketsubon Kyō) is an apocryphal Mahayana sutra of Chinese origin. The earliest version of this text was likely composed around the end of the 12th century or the beginning of the 13th.

== Overview ==
The Blood Bowl Sutra describes how Maudgalyāyana, disciple of the Buddha famous for his supernatural or magical powers, descended to hell to save his mother. He finds her in the company of women who are tormented by the hell wardens and are forced to drink their own menstrual blood. They are punished like this because the blood produced by their bodies pollutes the ground and offends the earth gods, or ends up in rivers from which the water to make tea for holy men is drawn.

== Belief ==
=== China ===
The place of the "Blood Bowl Sutra" in the evolution of related narratives and practices, especially those dealing with Mulian and the debts that sons owe their mothers, in Alan Cole's Mothers and Sons in Chinese Buddhism (Stanford University Press, 1998), especially in Chapter 9 titled "Buddhist Biology".

=== Japan ===
The belief that women descend to the underworld shortly after childbirth has been present in Japanese folklore for quite some time. Story 9 of Volume 3 in the Nihon Ryōiki tells of how a woman died in labor and went to hell.

Despite the Ōjōyōshū being one of the most important texts to describe hell, it bears no mention of the Blood Pool Hell. It is possible that the nature of hell as presented in the Blood Bowl Sutra was not introduced to Japanese religious thought until the Muromachi period. At Yama-dera temple, there is a pool called the "Blood Pond." It is said that at one time, the Blood Bowl Sutra was used for dedicatory services to women who had died in childbirth. A similar ceremony was likely held at Gangō-ji. Until relatively recently, ceremonies surrounding the Blood Bowl Sutra were also held at Shōsen-ji temple. Believers would enclose a copy of the Blood Bowl Sutra in women's coffins in order to save them from being condemned to the Blood Pond Hell. A copy of the sutra discovered at Saidai-ji appears to have been used in a similar fashion.

== Sources ==
- Alan Cole, Mothers and Sons in Chinese Buddhism (Stanford University Press, 1998)
- Glassman, Hank. "At the Crossroads of Birth and Death: The Blood-Pool Hell and Postmortem Fetal Extraction." In Death and the Afterlife in Japanese Buddhism. By Jacqueline I. Stone and Mariko N. Walter. Hononlulu.: University of Hawai'i, 2008. 175-206. Print.
- Faure, Bernard (2003). The Power of Denial: Buddhism, Purity, and Gender. Princeton University Press. ISBN 0-691-09171-4.
- Momoko, Takemi (1983), "'Menstruation Sutra' Belief in Japan" (PDF), Japanese Journal of Religious Studies, 10 (2–3): 229–246
