= Judy Clark (artist) =

British artist

- Born: 1949 (age 76–77)
- Education: Slade School of Art

Judy Clark (born 1949) is a British artist. She works in several media, including painting, assemblage, sculptural media, and print.

She studied at Portsmouth Polytechnic and the Slade School of Art. During the 1980s she worked in a studio in Carpenters Road in Stratford. Her work is in the permanent collection of the Tate Gallery.

== Early work ==
After exhibiting her post-graduate work at Slade, in June 1973 she was approached by the curators of the newly opened Garage Art gallery in London. She was invited to exhibit more of her work, and created the solo exhibition 'Issues' for November 1973. Clark was inspired by Mary Douglas anthropology work on taboos and disorder, published in Purity and Danger. Clark cited from the book throughout the exhibition. She was also inspired by travel in Europe, where she saw the contemporary work of Joseph Beuys, Dieter Rot, and others. Clark also cited a TV programme exploring fictional investigations of forensic science teams as an influence. 'Issues' explores the body through Clark's collection of bodily fluids and parts, such as menstruation and hair. Clark was one of the first artists to explore menstrual blood in her art. The exhibition received an unusual amount of attention for an artist who was young and just done with art school. 'Issues' was reviewed in mainstream media by Caroline Tisdall in The Guardian and Marina Valzey in Financial Times.

== Later work ==
In 2023-24, Clark's work 'Cycle' from 1973 was included in 'Women in Revolt!' exhibition at Tate Britain and touring

In 2001, Clark's work 'Housedust' from 1973 was included in 'Live In Your Head' exhibition at Whitechapel Art Gallery, London and touring

In 2001, Clark was commissioned to design a series of textile wall hangings for three 1st floor conference rooms in Portcullis House, Westminster.

In 2000, Clark received a major award from Arts Council to develop her artistic practice 2000-2003

In 1999, Clark won an Arts Council Grant for the exhibition 'A Rare Sighting' at Cable Street Gallery, London.

In 1998, Clark won an Arts Council Grant for the exhibition 'The Occupier' at Pallant House Gallery, Chichester, UK

== Solo exhibitions ==
- Solo exhibition, 'The Occupier,' Pallant House Gallery, Chichester, 1998
- Solo exhibition, 'Issues', Garage Art, Earlham Street, London, November–December 1973
