= Camilla Mørk Røstvik =

Norwegian academic and author

Academic background
- Education: University of Oslo; University of Manchester

Academic work
- Discipline: Art history, cultural history
- Sub-discipline: History of menstrual hygiene management
- Institutions: University of Agder; University of St Andrews

Camilla Mørk Røstvik is a Norwegian cultural historian, art historian and professor of history at the University of Agder. She is known for her research on the cultural history of menstruation, and is the author of Cash Flow: The Businesses of Menstruation (2022) and Period Art: The Visual Culture of Menstruation (2026).

== Education and career ==
Mørk Røstvik earned a BA in art history from the University of Oslo in 2011. She earned an MA from the University of Manchester in 2012, and a PhD in art history from the University of Manchester in 2016.

Prior to joining the History department at the University of Agder in 2022, Mørk Røstvik has worked at the University of St Andrews as a Leverhulme Research Fellow, where she was principal investigator for the project Arctic Periods: Transnational Knowledge about Menstrual History and Wellbeing, and as of 2022, remains an Honorary Research Fellow in Art History there. She has also worked as a postdoctoral fellow at the University of Leeds, and as a lecturer at University of Aberdeen. Mørk Røstvik has been described as "a scholar with expertise in visual cultures and feminist art histories".

== Research on the history and industry of menstruation ==
Mørk Røstvik has specialised in the history of menstrual hygiene management through period pads, tampons, period underwear and apps. In an interview with Aftenposten she explained how the companies producing pads in the mid-twentieth century had to break taboos and reduce the shame of menstruation to convince women to buy their products.

Trained as an art historian, Mørk Røstvik has a particular interest in the visual signs of menstruation. In an interview with Science Nordic, she explained: "Menstruation is a fantastic example of a visual sign that everybody knows of, but nobody ever sees. It is the red blood, which is very dramatic".

Her book, Cash Flow: The Businesses of Menstruation was published by UCL Press in 2022. The book covers the industry of period products, with chapters discussing the promotion of "menstrual hygiene" through the sales of pads and tampons from the 1950s on, exploring the marketing of companies like Norwegian Saba, Swedish Mölnlycke, and the US company Procter and Gamble. A chapter discusses how Tampax spread their brand to the Soviet Union in the 1980s and 1990s, and the 21st-century marketing of new period products like Thinx underwear and period tracking apps like Clue. The book has been featured in interviews with Mørk Røstvik by the Australian Broad Agenda, the Danish podcasting network Frihedsbrevet, and the Norwegian journal Kjønnsforskning. It has been reviewed on the website Feminism in India and in academic journals including the Scandinavian Economic History Review.

== Research on the history of scientific publishing ==
Røstvik co-authored the book A History of Scientific Journals: Publishing at the Royal Society, 1665-2015, the first comprehensive history of the journals of the Royal Society. The book has been reviewed in several journals.
