= Menstrual stigma =

Negative cultural perceptions surrounding menstruation

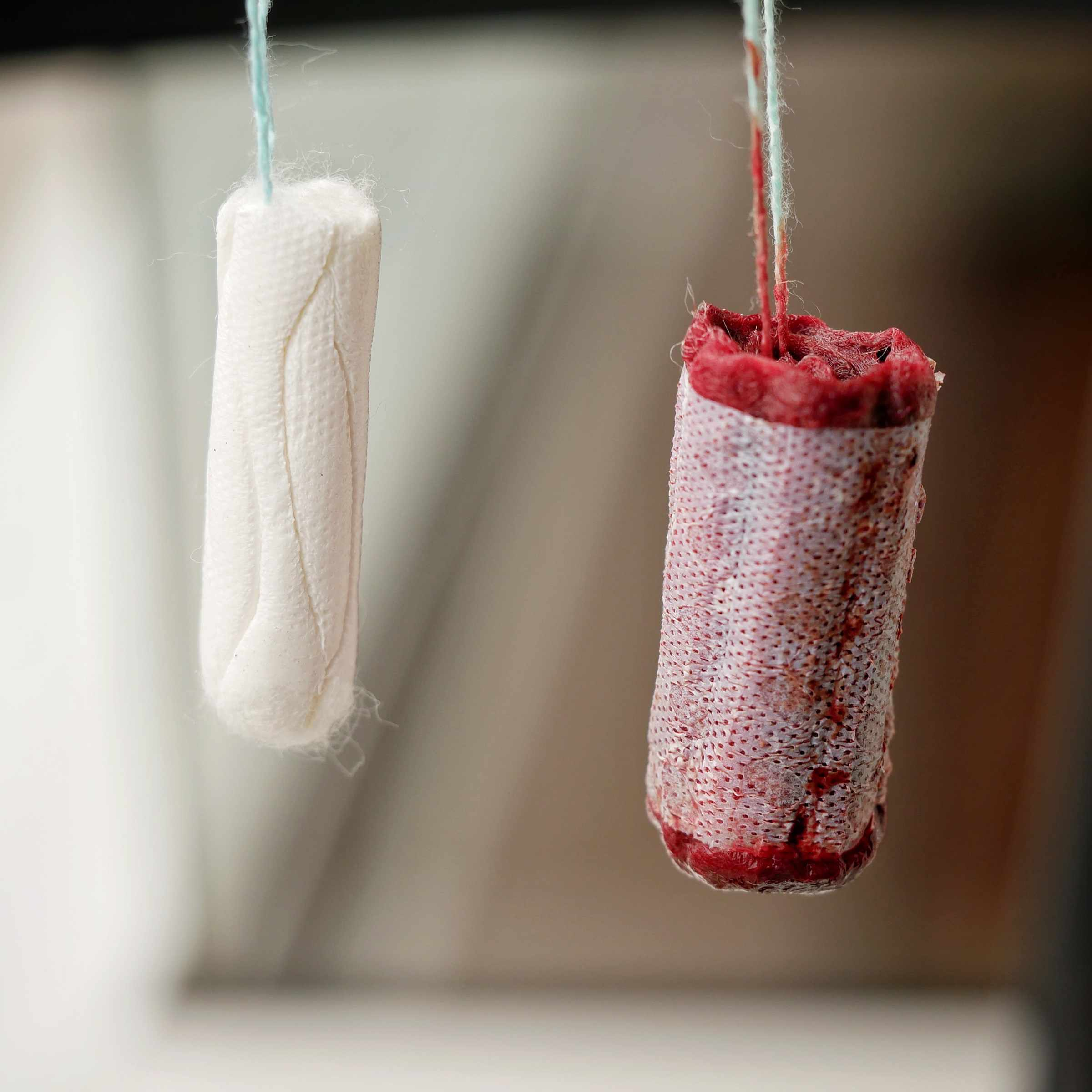
This photo shows unused and used tampons, while the advertisement employs euphemistic colors, such as blue instead of red

Menstrual stigma, also known as period stigma, refers to the negative social and cultural perceptions, beliefs, taboos, and practices surrounding menstruation and those who menstruate. It encompasses the perception of menstruation as impure or shameful, often resulting in secrecy, emotional distress, and even discrimination. The manifestation of menstrual stigma varies across cultures and may have profound effects on mental health, social participation, school attendance, workplace involvement, healthcare access, and opportunities. The stigma impacts people across age, socioeconomic class, and gender, including transgender and nonbinary individuals. Strategies aimed at addressing menstrual stigma typically involve education, awareness, and equity initiatives.

== Stigmatization ==
=== Cultural and Country Variations ===
Menstruation, deeply intertwined with intricate cultural beliefs, is often accompanied by taboos, myths, stigmatization, negative emotions, and feelings of shame. The associated beliefs and practices exhibit variations influenced by factors like country, religion, and social status. Cultural norms play a pivotal role in determining whether menstruation is a source of social stigma that is concealed or observable. For instance, in the United States, menstruation is predominantly concealed owing to societal norms of secrecy. In Tanzania, both Christian and Muslim menstruating individuals report experiencing religion-based menstrual restrictions, including being prohibited from prayer during menstruation. Those who menstruate in Sub-Saharan Africa are frequently excluded from social and personal activities, inclusive of religious practices, cooking, sexual intercourse, sleeping in their beds, and even sitting near men. In certain societies like Nepal, the onset of menstruation is commemorated through public rituals, and those undergoing menstruation may be secluded.

Cultures and regions also vary in the knowledge individuals have about menstruation, as well as their access to adequate menstrual hygiene products. For example, roughly 50% of menstruating adolescents in India have no knowledge of menstruation before menarche. According to a 2023 national survey, nearly 25% of teens and approximately one-third of adults in the United States report challenges in accessing affordable period products. Research shows that, among American adolescents, menstrual knowledge and preparedness are disproportionately lowest among low-income and BIPOC populations. Furthermore, the Supplemental Nutrition Assistance Program (SNAP) in the U.S., commonly known as food stamps, only covers food items, excluding hygiene products such as shampoo, soap, toothpaste, and menstrual supplies. As of now, there is no federal program in the U.S. that provides assistance for menstrual products.

Some countries, on the other hand, have found success in passing legislation to expand period product access. Scotland, for example, passed the Period Products (Free Provision) Act 2021, which made the country the first in the world to legally mandate free period products for anyone in need.

The notion that menstruation is a cause of impurity and danger has persisted into the contemporary era. According to a survey conducted by the World Health Organization involving women from 10 different countries, certain cultures still view menstruating women as impure, leading to restrictions in their religious or social activities. The WHO survey not only recorded both negative and positive attitudes toward menstruation but also highlighted culturally enforced sanctions (such as being prohibited from cooking) and self-imposed restrictions (such as refraining from washing one's hair).

=== Euphemisms ===
People often use euphemisms like "time of the month," "Aunt Flow," and "on the rag" to refer to menstruation, highlighting the discomfort and stigma associated with it. This stigma is a global phenomenon, with menstruation often seen as something impure that should be kept private. Many individuals, from a young age, are taught that menstruation is something to be concealed or hidden for women to lead their everyday lives. The media plays a role in perpetuating this stigma through advertisements that stress secrecy, avoidance of embarrassment, and freshness. They also use euphemistic images and colors (like blue instead of red) to describe menstruation. Menstrual stigma can be passed on through educational materials, communication (or lack thereof), and the language used to discuss it (e.g., euphemisms).

Scholar Kate McHugh introduces the term "menstrual moaning" to describe how women often talk about menstruation in negative terms, focusing on pain, discomfort, or moodiness. This negative talk surrounding menstruation can further reinforce menstrual shame and cultural beliefs that portray women's bodies as defective or impure.

=== Activism ===
Feminists and various activists have countered negative depictions of menstruation by advocating for positive perspectives. They do so primarily through educational and media campaigns, consciousness-raising efforts, and by challenging conventional representations of menstruation. These actions aim to promote more affirming views of menstruation within various institutions like education, healthcare, families, and media. While feminist scholars and activists have endeavored to encourage the celebration of menarche and menstruation, their positive messages may be eclipsed or obscured by the prevailing stigmatizing narratives.

Activists and their works––such as Gloria Steinem, who wrote the satirical essay "If Men Could Menstruate," and Judy Chicago who created the photolithograph titled "Red Flag"––have challenged menstrual stigma by confronting cultural taboos and highlighting the gendered politics of menstruation. Organizations such as #HappyPeriod and Period: the Menstrual Movement have worked to provide low-income and homeless communities with menstrual hygiene products.

== Consequences ==
The menstrual stigma can have detrimental effects on various aspects of women's lives, including their overall well-being, somatic and mental health, social status, and sexual activity.

=== Mental Health ===
Women who internalize these negative attitudes often take active measures to hide their menstrual status, such as wearing loose clothing and avoiding certain activities to prevent any signs. This constant effort to conceal their menstruation leads to increased self-awareness, heightened vigilance, and a sense of shame related to their periods. Failing to hide it can make them feel as though they've fallen short of societal expectations of proper menstrual etiquette.

=== Sexuality ===
The stigma can have adverse effects on women's sexual lives since engaging in sexual activity during menstruation is often viewed as socially unacceptable. Both men and women may use derogatory terms like "disgusting," "smelly," "awkward," "dirty," and "messy" when referring to menstruation and sex during this time. Younger, single individuals with less sexual experience are more likely to avoid intercourse during menstruation and use negative language to describe it. In contrast, older, more experienced couples are more inclined to see sexual activity during menstruation as acceptable and enjoyable.

== Menstrual Stigma in Education and the Workplace ==
Menstrual stigma significantly impacts individuals in both education and professional environments, often exacerbating gender inequality and hindering access to opportunity.

=== Education ===
In schools, menstruation is often associated with shame and secrecy. Students report feeling embarrassed to change menstrual products during the school day, often concealing products and avoiding bathroom trips for fear of their menstrual status being exposed to classmates and teachers. Some adolescents report discomfort requesting bathroom access from teachers, and that the embarrassment from menstrual stains has led them to leave school.

Pain management presents additional challenges. Despite needing medication for cramps or other symptoms, students are often prohibited from bringing painkillers to school, resulting in covert use or unrelieved suffering. Moreover, a lack of consistent nursing staff in schools further hinders access to care, contributing to decreased academic engagement and social withdrawal during menstruation.

These challenges may increase for menstruating adolescents in low-income areas, where there are inadequate bathroom conditions––poor privacy measures and menstrual product disposal options.

Several studies in the United States indicate that although many boys express curiosity about the developmental changes girls experience, they are frequently excluded from menstruation-related education both at home and in school––thus, increasing their likelihood of adopting common misconceptions and teasing behavior toward their female peers.

=== The Workplace ===
In the workplace, menstruation remains a stigmatized topic. Employees may feel compelled to hide menstrual symptoms or avoid discussing their needs due to perceptions that menstruation is unprofessional. Shift workers in industries like healthcare and manufacturing are especially vulnerable. A 2023 meta-analysis found that women working night or rotating shifts had significantly higher rates of menstrual disorders, dysmenorrhea, and early menopause due to circadian rhythm disruption.

== Gender Inclusivity and Trans Experiences ==
Menstrual stigma also disproportionately affects transgender men, nonbinary individuals, and intersex people who menstruate. These groups often face additional challenges related to gender and body dysmorphia. The association of menstruation with womanhood can trigger distress among trans-masculine and nonbinary individuals, especially during puberty, when menstruation may feel in conflict with their gender identity. Many trans and nonbinary people avoid using public restrooms while menstruating due to their anxiety about trans menstrual stigma. Some trans people use hormonal therapies such as testosterone to suppress menstruation, but not all have access to or desire this form of care. For those who continue to menstruate, navigating menstrual stigma in unsupportive environments can lead to psychological harm, isolation, and medical neglect.

Recent efforts to promote gender-inclusive menstrual equity—such as providing menstrual products in all-gender bathrooms and using terms like "people who menstruate"—have sought to expand awareness and reduce stigma. However, the needs of trans and nonbinary people remain under-researched and often overlooked in mainstream menstrual health discourse.

== Interconnected stigmas ==
Menstrual stigma is a significant element of the broader issue of endometriosis stigma. The negative attitudes toward menstruation play a pivotal role in perpetuating the stigma surrounding endometriosis. While much of the existing research on endometriosis stigma has primarily focused on menstrual pain and the associated stigma, it's crucial to recognize that chronic pain, in general, carries its own societal stigma. Considering that endometriosis involves persistent pain during menstruation, sexual activity, and pelvic symptoms, this pain-related stigma can exacerbate the overall stigma associated with endometriosis, leading to adverse mental health outcomes. Furthermore, infertility stigma is another factor contributing to the overall stigma surrounding endometriosis. Many individuals with endometriosis experience infertility issues, and this aspect of the condition can lead to feelings of depression and anxiety.

It's important to note that stigma operates on multiple levels, including self-stigma (internalized negative attitudes), perceived stigma (how individuals believe society views them), and experienced stigma (actual instances of discrimination). These various forms of stigma have been observed to have a significant impact on the well-being of individuals living with various chronic illnesses, including endometriosis.

Lack of access to clean water, safe, private sanitary facilities, education, and menstrual hygiene products is referred to as period poverty. Millions of menstrual people worldwide are impacted, particularly those from low-income neighborhoods. Social stigma, missed job or school, and health issues can all arise from this lack of access. Menstrual products are still subject to luxury taxation in some nations, which exacerbates gender inequality and adds to financial obstacles. Menstrual hygiene, according to academics, need to be viewed as a fundamental health necessity rather than a private or optional matter.

Some governments and organizations have implemented laws that provide free access to menstruation products in public areas in an effort to alleviate these disparities. Scotland and Kenya, for instance, have put in place statewide initiatives that provide goods in workplaces and schools. The Period Products and Facilities (Access) Act 2023 in Australia promotes menstruation fairness across public sectors by requiring free products in schools, hospitals, and libraries. In order to eliminate social taboos and enable young people to comprehend and control their reproductive health, experts also stress the need of menstrual education.

== See also ==
- Reproductive health care for incarcerated women in the United States
- Culture and menstruation
- Transgender health care
- Menstrual leave
- Endometriosis
- Dysmenorrhea
- Period poverty
- Tampon tax
