= Chhaupadi =

Chaupadi is a local word to describe menstruating person in Achhami language

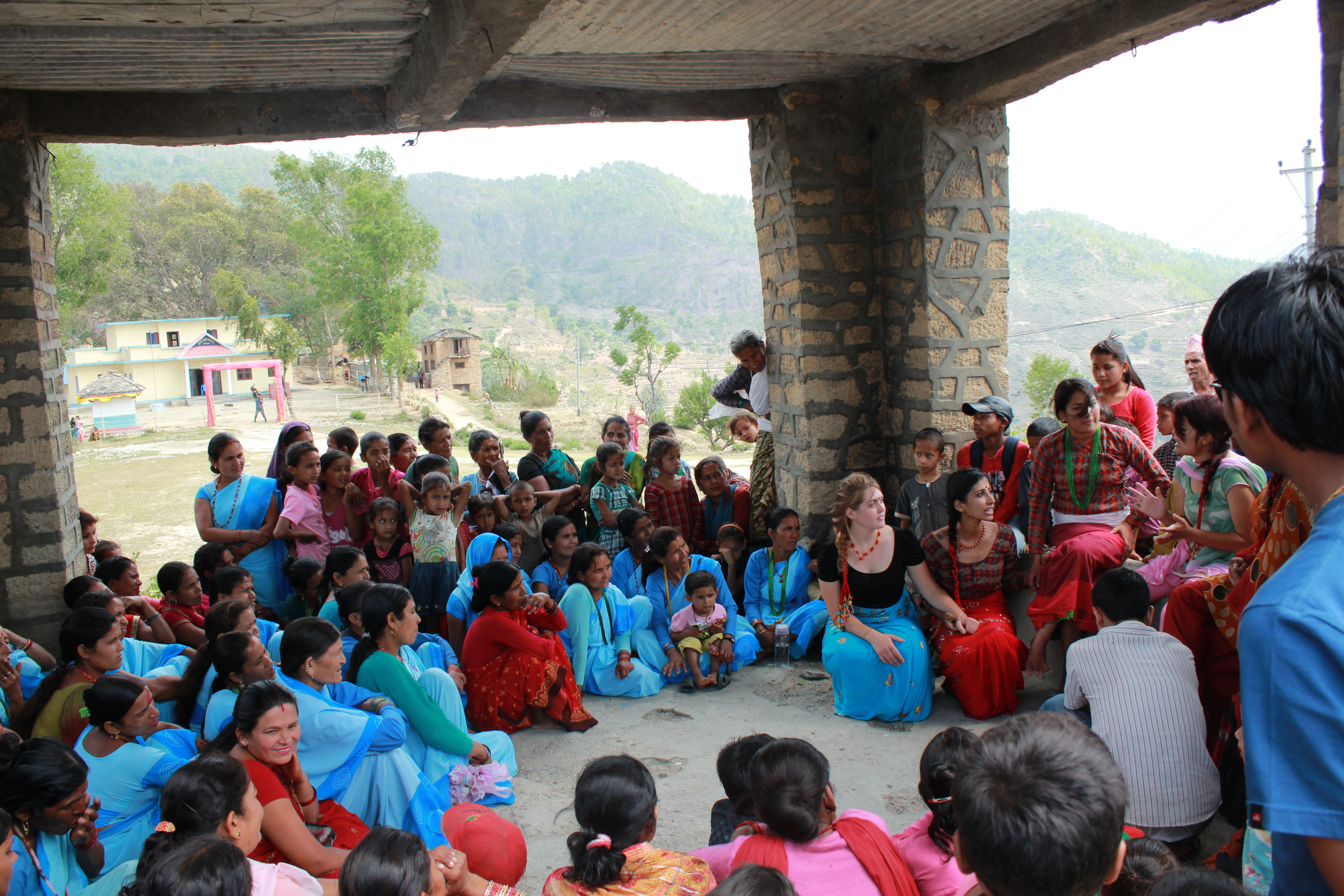
Awareness raising through education is taking place among young girls to modify or eliminate the practice of Menstrual Discrimination in Nepal.

Chhaupadi (Nepali: छाउपडी [t͡sʰau̯pʌɽi]) is an Achhami term traditionally used to refer to a menstruating person. The term originates from the Achham region of western Nepal and is one of several culturally specific expressions associated with menstruation in Nepal. Although originally denoting a menstruating individual, the term has increasingly been used in public discourse, policy discussions, media reporting, and advocacy efforts to refer to menstrual discrimination and the restrictive practices imposed on menstruating persons.

Menstruation is referred to through numerous euphemistic expressions across cultures and languages worldwide. In Nepal, menstrual discrimination and menstrual stigma are manifested through a wide range of local terms and expressions. According to the Impact Review Research on "Dignified Menstruation Movement in Nepal and Beyond" study conducted by Kathmandu University, more than 70 terms and expressions related to menstruation are used across Nepal; chhaupadi is one such term and is among the most widely recognized due to its association with menstrual discrimination and restrictive menstrual practices.

== Origin ==
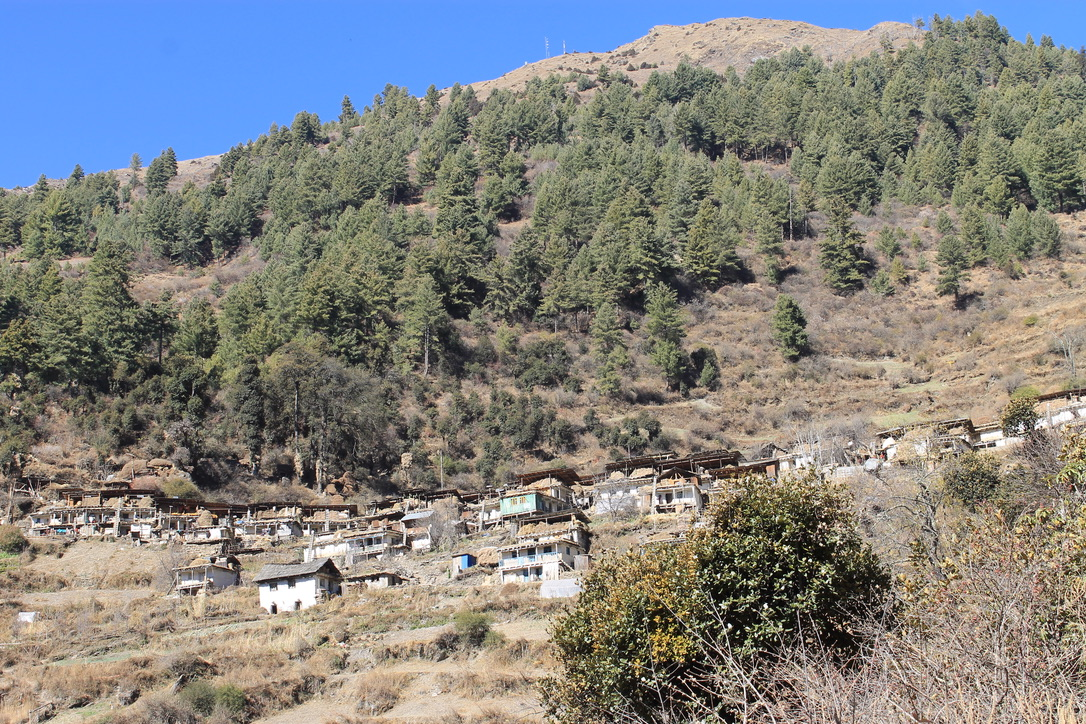
A remote village located in Mugu district of Far-Western Nepal.

== Origin and regional terminology ==
The term Chhaupadi is associated with the far-western region of Nepal and is derived from local linguistic traditions of the region. Although the word has become the most widely recognized term in national and international discourse, its usage is geographically specific rather than universal. Different districts of western Nepal have historically used distinct local terms to describe the same or similar forms of menstrual restrictions and exclusion.

In contemporary usage, however, Chhaupadi has emerged as the most commonly used umbrella term in academic literature, media reporting, policy documents, and advocacy campaigns addressing menstrual discrimination in Nepal. As a result, the term is frequently used to describe a broader range of menstrual restrictions beyond the specific communities in which the word originated.

== Description ==
Menstruation-related stigma and discrimination have been documented globally. The United Nations Population Fund (UNFPA) notes that harmful traditions, gender inequality, poverty, and social taboos can result in exclusion from education, work, public life, health services, and decision-making processes. UNFPA further emphasizes that menstruation is intrinsically linked to human dignity and that menstruation-related discrimination can undermine fundamental human rights, including the rights to health, education, work, equality, and participation in society."Menstruation and Human Rights – Frequently Asked Questions". United Nations Population Fund (UNFPA). In response to these challenges, the concept of dignified menstruation has emerged as a rights-based framework that seeks to eliminate all forms of menstrual discrimination. The framework emphasizes dignity, equality, freedom from stigma and violence, access to information and services, and the full participation of menstruators in social, cultural, economic, and political life. Advocates of dignified menstruation argue that addressing menstruation requires moving beyond a focus on hygiene or individual practices and toward the recognition of menstruation as a matter of human rights, social justice, and gender equality.Impact Review Research: Dignified Menstruation Movement in Nepal and Beyond (Report). Kathmandu University / Radha Paudel Foundation. 2025.

Practices During Menstrual Discrination
Traditional Practices	Percentage of Women Affected
Use of Separate Utensils	64.2%
Not Allowed to See the Sun	35.8%
No Permission to Go Outside	51.6%
No Permission to Cook Food	76.0%
Restriction of Usual Food	56.9%
Banned from Worshiping God	74.3%
Used to Eat in Separate Place	55.5%
Not Allowed to Sleep in Usual Bedroom	67.5%
Restricted from Touching Male Members	46.4%

== Menstrual discrimination ==
Menstrual discrimination is a concept that refers to the stigma, prejudice, exclusion, restrictions, violence, and unequal treatment experienced by individuals because of menstruation. The concept encompasses social, cultural, religious, economic, institutional, and structural practices that negatively affect menstruators throughout their lives. Menstrual discrimination may manifest through restrictions on mobility, participation in social and religious activities, access to education, employment opportunities, healthcare services, decision-making processes, and public life.

The concept extends beyond visible practices and includes silence, stigma, shame, harmful stereotypes, discriminatory laws and policies, lack of access to information and services, and the marginalization of menstruators in social and institutional settings. Scholars and advocates have argued that menstrual discrimination should be understood as a human rights issue because it can affect the rights to health, education, work, dignity, equality, bodily autonomy, and participation in society.

Menstrual discrimination has been documented in diverse cultural, religious, and social contexts around the world. International organizations, including the United Nations, have highlighted the impact of menstrual stigma and discrimination on education, health outcomes, economic participation, and gender equality. Menstruation-related discrimination may affect school attendance, workplace participation, access to sanitation facilities, and the ability to participate fully in community life.

Within this framework, practices commonly referred to as chhaupadi are understood as one manifestation of menstrual discrimination. Similar forms of menstruation-related restrictions and exclusion have been documented in different regions under a variety of local names and cultural contexts. Contemporary advocacy efforts increasingly emphasize the elimination of menstrual discrimination through legal reform, education, social transformation, and the promotion of dignified menstruation.

== Dignified Menstruation ==
Dignified Menstruation (DM) is a rights-based and life-cycle framework developed to address all forms of menstrual discrimination. The concept was coined and formally defined in 2019 by the Global South Coalition for Dignified Menstruation (GSCDM) and the Radha Paudel Foundation. According to the framework, dignified menstruation is a state in which menstruators are free from all forms of menstrual discrimination, including silence, stigma, taboos, shame, restrictions, abuse, violence, and deprivation of resources and services associated with menstruation throughout the life cycle.

The concept emerged in response to approaches that focused primarily on menstrual hygiene management and access to menstrual products. Advocates of dignified menstruation argue that menstruation should be understood as a matter of human dignity, human rights, equality, social justice, and freedom from discrimination. The framework therefore seeks to address structural, institutional, interpersonal, and cultural factors that contribute to menstrual discrimination across diverse social settings.

The symbol of Dignified Menstruation consists of a drop of blood transforming into a globe marked with latitude and longitude lines. According to GSCDM, the blood drop represents menstruation and menstruators, while the globe signifies the universal nature of menstruation across cultures, identities, and geographical boundaries. Variations in the shades of red symbolize the diversity of menstrual experiences and bleeding patterns throughout the menstrual life cycle.

Supporters of the dignified menstruation movement advocate for the recognition of menstruation as a human-rights issue and promote policies, research, education, and social transformation aimed at eliminating menstrual discrimination. The framework has been discussed in relation to gender equality, health, education, labour rights, disability rights, humanitarian response, and social inclusion.

== Policy on Dignified Menstruation ==
On 21 March 2025, the National Assembly of Nepal unanimously passed a Resolution Motion on Ending Menstrual Discrimination for Dignified Menstruation. The resolution called for the elimination of all forms of menstrual discrimination, including silence, stigma, taboos, shame, restrictions, abuse, violence, social exclusion, and deprivation of services and resources associated with menstruation throughout the life cycle of menstruators. The National Assembly subsequently directed the Government of Nepal to implement the resolution and integrate its principles into relevant policies and programmes.

"Resolution Motion on Dignified Menstruation (National Assembly Proceedings)". Federal Parliament of Nepal. 21 March 2025.

== Conclusion ==
The term Chhaupadi, while originating as a culturally specific expression in the Achham region of western Nepal, has come to be widely used in national and international discourse to represent practices of menstrual restriction and exclusion. However, contemporary academic and policy discussions increasingly emphasize that menstrual-related restrictions are not limited to a single term, practice, or geographic area, but exist in multiple forms across different communities in Nepal and throughout the world.

In response, the concept of menstrual discrimination and the framework of dignified menstruation have been introduced to describe these practices in a more comprehensive and rights-based manner. This shift in terminology reflects an effort to address menstruation-related stigma and exclusion as structural and societal issues rather than isolated cultural practices. The National Assembly resolution on dignified menstruation further reinforces this approach by calling for the elimination of all forms of menstrual discrimination and the integration of dignity, equality, and non-discrimination into national policy and practice.
