= Sanitary bin =

Disposal container for used sanitary products

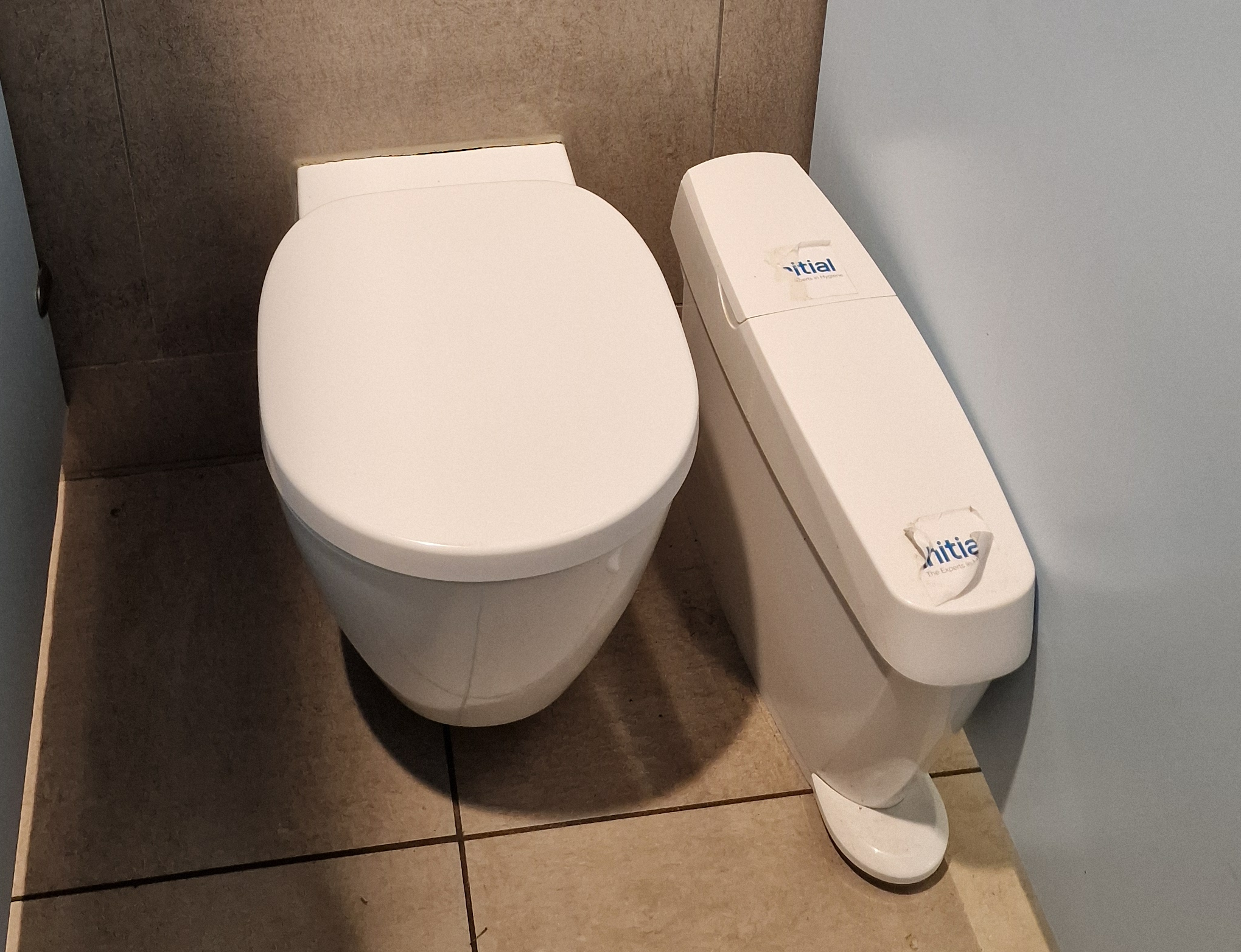
Sanitary bin next to toilet in England

A sanitary bin is a small receptacle for used menstrual hygiene products that is usually installed in toilet cubicles in many countries of the world. In New York, USA, in 1952 George S. James patented a 'sanitary waste disposal bin'. In the United Kingdom in 1955, Cannon Hygiene were the first waste management company to supply sanitary bins.

== Background ==
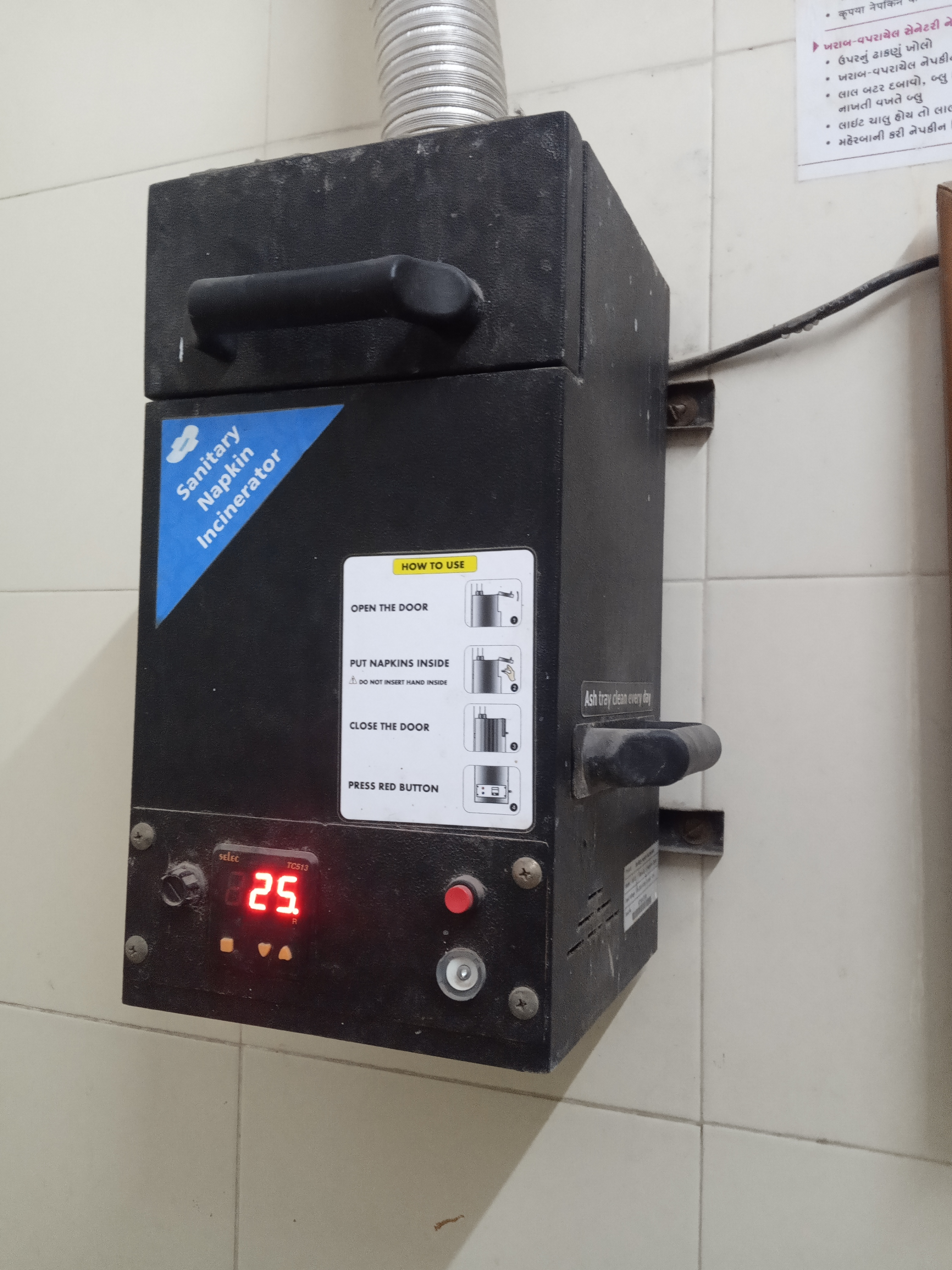
Sanitary napkin incinerator in India

Disposable menstrual products were an invention in the early twentieth century, but initially there were no specialist waste receptacles to contain them. Some public toilets contained small cremators, which incinerated the waste products, but more often there was no provision. This meant that most people had to flush, hide or carry these products out of the toilets themselves. One early provider of incinerators in the UK was Southalls' Sanitary Requisites, who were advertising the devices in 1916. The largest manufacturer of incinerators in the UK in the mid-twentieth century was Wandsworth Electrical Manufacturing Company; these were given the soubriquet 'bunnie incinerators'. However they were not common, and women were more likely to flush or hide used products. The issue of hiding menstrual products was noticeable during the Second World War in England, and the Medical Women's Federation (MWF) established a 'Menstruation Leaflet Committee' to spread information to counter the issue. The MWF suggested the process that is recognizable to many today – that each cubicle contains a paper bag for used menstrual products, and a bin for them to be put in.

== Early use and development ==
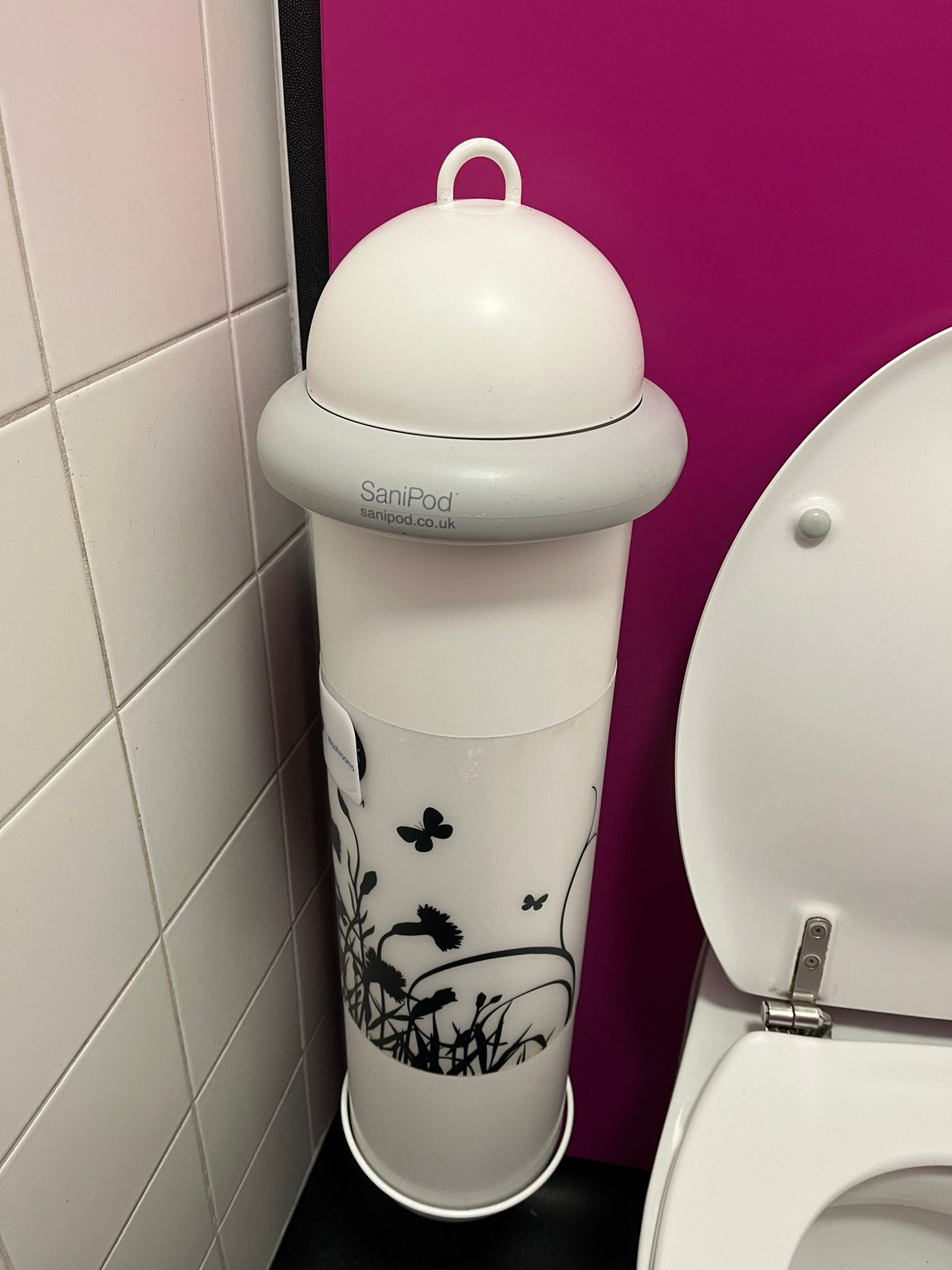
Sanipod bin in England

In New York, USA, in 1952 George S. James patented a 'sanitary waste disposal bin'. In 1955, Cannon Hygiene (Citron Hygiene) were the first waste management company to supply sanitary bins, especially as the number of women in the workforce was growing in post-war Britain. Original Cannon bins were blue in colour, and in 2018 could still be found in some public bathrooms in Scotland. Other companies joined the industry, with PHS and Rentokil offering a 'sanitary unit exchange', where new bins were supplied and the used ones removed, emptied, washed and returned to another location. Anecdotally, PHS became involved in the industry due to the suggestion made by one of the company secretaries to its owners Alfred and George Tack.

In the United Kingdom in the 1970s, there was expansion in the use of menstrual products, but still an absence of disposal options, especially in public places. The Women's Environment Network (WEN) raised this as an issue arguing that the huge amounts of waste created additional landfill, as well as air pollution through incineration, challenges to plumbing and water pollution. A further innovation in sanitary bins came as a response to research commissioned by Rentokil in the United Kingdom in 1980, which stated that over 70% of used menstrual products also had traces of feces and bacteria. This led to the treatment of sanitary bins with bactericides as part of the re-sanitation process throughout the 1980s.

Touch-free sanitary bin In Ireland

New legislation in the UK in the 1990s meant that employers had a responsibility to provide safe methods for disposal. This meant that by the mid-1990s sanitary bins were common in toilets. In the 2010s, there was a trend for more aesthetic sanitary bins in the UK: Canon Hygiene introduced cylindrical wall-mounted bins; Initial introduced brightly coloured bins. Innovations also included bins with a no-touch sensor, where the 'modesty flap' (the lid) opens automatically.

== Fabrication ==
In the UK most sanitary bins are constructed from acrylonitrile butadiene styrene, which is a recyclable plastic. They generally have a capacity of 23 litres and have 460 mm × 425 mm × 200 mm (18.1 in × 16.7 in × 7.9 in).

In 2010, Woman's Hour host Emma Barnett drew attention to the poor design of some women's toilets, which often have very little space for sanitary bins, or the containers are added as an afterthought.

== Inclusion ==
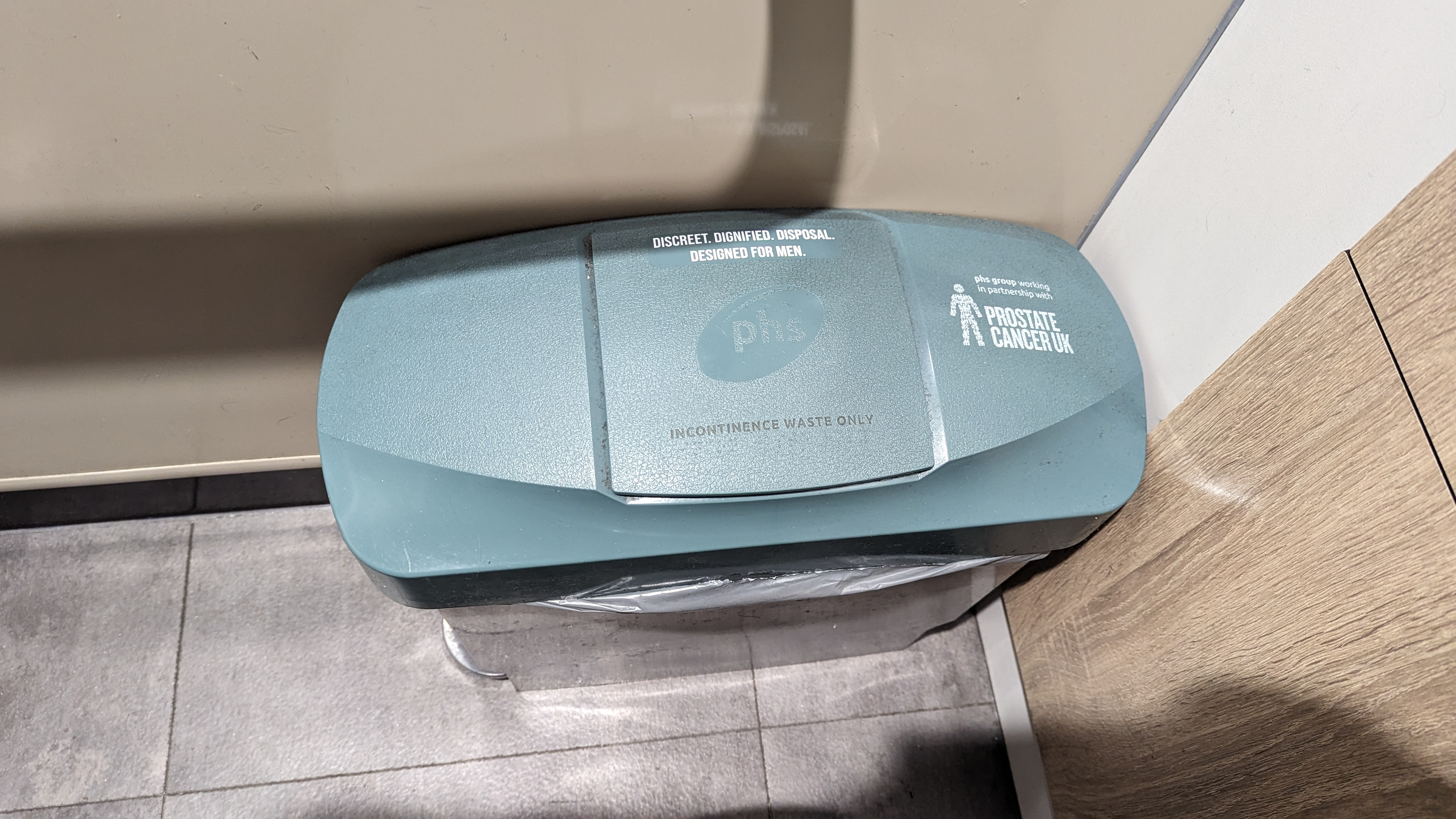
Incontinence waste bin targeted to men in England

In the UK, the campaign 'Boys Need Bins' led by Prostate Cancer UK has been drawing attention to the need for sanitary bins to be placed in male toilets. In Japan, they are not often installed in men's restrooms, but there are requests from men who use incontinence pads, and there is a movement to install them.

In 2024, the Football Association launched an investigation as to why sanitary bins weren't available in all the women's toilets at the FA Cup Final.

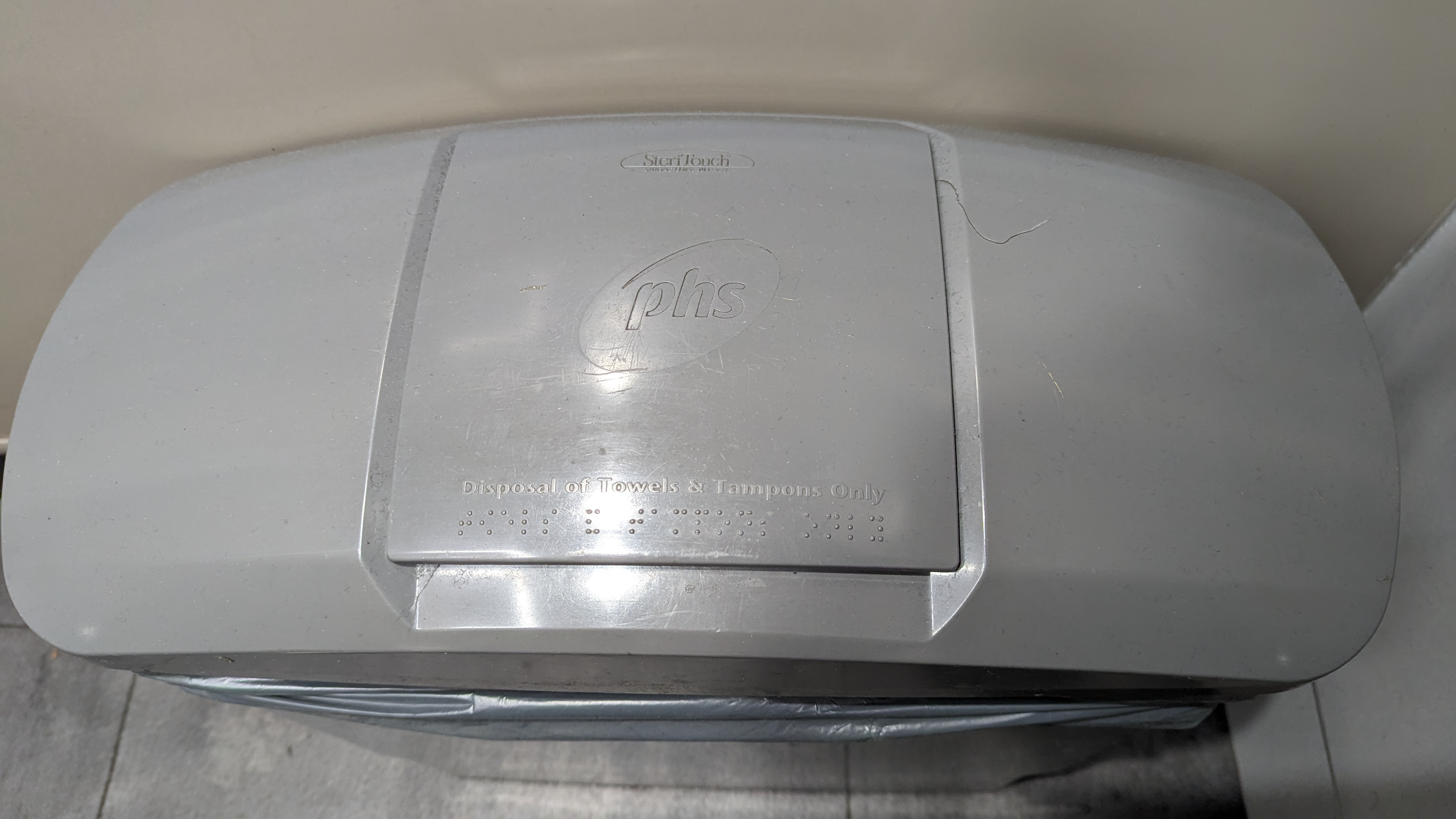
Sanitary bin with braille in England

Some sanitary bins feature Braille on the lids, a feature designed to better enable visually-impaired people using the receptacles.

== Art ==
Artist Judy Chicago was one the first to engage with sanitary bins as part of her practice; her installation Menstruation Bathroom (part of Womanhouse) featured bins overflowing with menstrual products. In the 2000s, artist and zinester Chella Quint, placed educational zines into the paper bags provided in toilets for used menstrual products.

== Anti-terrorism ==
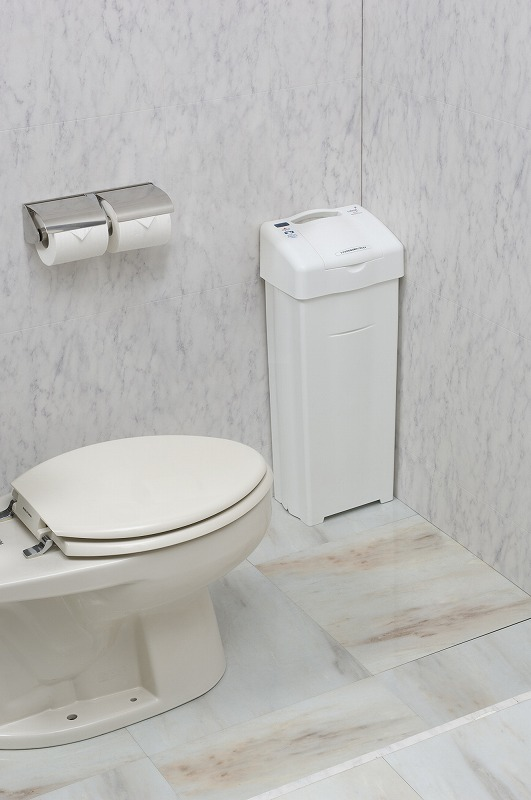
Sanitary bin in Japan

Due to increased security measures for the G20 Osaka Summit in 2019, coin lockers and trash cans in stations around Tokyo and Osaka were closed, including sanitary bins in women's restrooms. These were removed from stations on Seibu Railway by the Tokyo Metropolitan Bureau of Transportation. There was a backlash on their removal, which railway managers and security experts did not anticipate, due to the fact that no alternative solutions were considered for what to do with used sanitary products. Sanitary bins were even removed in Tokyo, which is 450 km (280 mi) away from Osaka.
