= Water Supply and Sanitation Collaborative Council =

United Nations membership organization

- Successor: Sanitation and Hygiene Fund
- Formation: 1990
- Dissolved: 2020
- Type: Intergovernmental organization
- Purpose: Sanitation, hygiene
- Location: Geneva, Switzerland
- Region served: Worldwide, with particular focus on developing countries in Sub-Saharan Africa and South Asia
- Key people: Sue Coates, Executive Director a.i. Hind Khatib-Othman, chair of steering committee, both till end 2020
- Website: wsscc.org

Vision and Mission
- WSSCC's Vision is “A world in which everyone, everywhere is able to practice safe sanitation and hygiene with dignity.”

The Water Supply and Sanitation Collaborative Council (WSSCC) was a United Nations-hosted organization contributing to Sustainable Development Goal 6, Target 6.2 on sanitation and hygiene. It was established in 1990 and closed at the end of 2020. WSSCC advocated for improved sanitation and hygiene, with a focus on the needs of women, girls and people in vulnerable situations.

WSSCC's main areas of focus were large-scale sanitation and hygiene behaviour change programmes through the Global Sanitation Fund.

== Background ==
WSSCC worked to address the sanitation crisis and promote universal access to sanitation in collaboration with a range of partners. The United Nations estimates that some 2.2 billion people lack basic sanitation services and 3 billion people lack access to basic handwashing facilities at home. Poor sanitation costs countries approximately $229 billion annually (in 2015).

WSSCC contributed to the achievement of Sustainable Development Goal 6, Target 6.2: "By 2030, achieve access to adequate and equitable sanitation and hygiene for all and end open defecation, paying special attention to the needs of women and girls and those in vulnerable situations."

== Activities ==
WSSCC collaborated with government agencies, non-governmental organizations, international organizations, civil society groups and the private sector internationally and at the national, regional and local levels. The organization also drew public attention for sanitation and hygiene topics on international days such as World Water Day, Menstrual Hygiene Day, World Toilet Day and Global Handwashing Day.

=== Global Sanitation Fund ===
Through the Global Sanitation Fund (GSF), a multi-donor United Nations trust fund, WSSCC supported national efforts to help rural communities improve their sanitation and adopt good hygiene practices. The GSF funded behaviour change activities. Community-led total sanitation was frequently utilized by GSF-funded national programmes, such as in Cambodia and Nigeria.

The GSF funded national programmes in Benin, Cambodia, Ethiopia, Kenya, Madagascar, Malawi, Nepal, Nigeria, Senegal, Tanzania, Togo and Uganda. WSSCC's Secretariat gathered funds and donations at the global level, selected the eligible countries for funding, and managed the disbursement of grants to national sanitation programmes.

In the period of 2008 to 2018, the Global Sanitation Fund allocated over US$119 to sanitation projects in developing countries.

The Global Sanitation Fund was a multi-donor United Nations trust fund that aims to help large numbers of people in developing countries improve their sanitation and adopt good hygiene practices. GSF was positioned as an innovative way to finance sustainable development.

==== Scope ====
Currently, 2 billion people lack access to basic sanitation services, and 673 million defecate in the open. Diarrheal disease, a preventable disease largely caused by poor sanitation and hygiene, is a leading cause of child malnutrition and mortality, claiming around 525,000 lives of children under 5 every year.

The GSF, along with a diverse range of sector actors, was aimed at helping address the sanitation and hygiene crisis by enabling tens of millions of people to live in open defecation free (ODF) environments and access adequate toilets and handwashing facilities. These activities were also aimed at supporting the achievement of the Sustainable Development Goal Number 6. The United Nations system has identified global funding for sanitation and hygiene as key to enabling member countries to achieve their national development targets.

The GSF funded behaviour change activities to help large numbers of poor people in hard to reach areas attain safe sanitation and adopt good hygiene practices. These activities can be described as having been community-based, supporting national efforts, and bringing together a diverse group of stakeholders. The GSF worked with a range of prominent entities in the water, sanitation and hygiene sectors including the World Bank, Water Aid, UN-Water, UNICEF, the World Health Organization, Global Poverty Project and the CLTS Foundation.

Community-led total sanitation was frequently utilized by GSF-funded national programmes, such as in Cambodia and Nigeria.

The GSF previously funded, national programmes in Benin, Cambodia, Ethiopia, India, Kenya, Madagascar, Malawi, Nepal, Nigeria, Senegal, Tanzania, Togo and Uganda. Results as of closing were: 18.1 million people with access to improved sanitation facilities; 24.4 million people living in open defecation free environments; and 23.8 million people with access to basic handwashing facilities on premises.

Governments in the following countries, mainly through the development assistance programmes, have contributed to the now closed GSF. They are:

- Australia
- Finland
- The Netherlands
- Norway
- Sweden
- Switzerland
- The United Kingdom

The GSF was established by WSSCC to boost financing to countries with high needs for improved sanitation. It was first established in 2007, in response to the United Nations Human Development Report for 2006, which raised the issue of the global sanitation crisis.

=== Menstrual hygiene management ===
A key challenge that WSSCC focused on relates to the inclusion of menstrual hygiene management in the sustainable development agenda. WSSCC highlighted that the taboo surrounding menstruation is a barrier to equal participation and opportunities for women. A National Public Radio article highlighted that many policy makers often admit that they had never considered questions around menstruation before.

=== Equality and non-discrimination ===
WSSCC advocated for equality, human rights and non-discrimination as central to ensuring access to safe water supply, adequate sanitation and good hygiene for all. In particular, WSSCC WASH advocated to promote women's participation and leadership and menstrual hygiene and health.

=== Other focus areas ===
Other focus areas of the WSSCC included sustaining behaviour change as well as ensuring reliable and consistent monitoring, particularly of households that return to previously abandoned unhygienic behaviours. WSSCC worked on these issues through systems strengthening and impact evaluations.

=== Reports and campaigns ===
Notable reports and campaigns supported by WSSCC included:

- 'We Can't Wait', a report in 2015 on sanitation and hygiene for women and girls produced in collaboration with WaterAid and Unilever
- The Global Water Supply and Sanitation Assessment report produced in collaboration with the WHO and UNICEF in 2015
- The United Nations 'End Open Defecation' campaign in 2015
- The Women for Water and Sanitation Declaration, sanctioned by the first ladies of Madagascar and Malawi, among others in 2015

== Organizational structure ==
WSSCC was administratively and legally hosted by the United Nations Office for Project Services (UNOPS) since 2009. WSSCC's Secretariat was governed by its Steering Committee. WSSCC's secretariat was headquartered in Geneva, Switzerland. WSSCC was an unincorporated membership organization and not a separate legal entity.

WSSCC's Steering Committee decided the policies and strategies of the organization, managed the governance process, and was accountable to both the membership and the donors for its work. It was made up of a chair, regional members, partner agency members, ex officio members, non-voting invitees, and permanent non-voting observers. All WSSCC members were eligible to stand and vote in elections for the Steering Committee.

WSSCC was the only UN body devoted solely to sanitation and hygiene.

WSSCC had members in 150 countries.

The "WSSCC community" included staff based in Geneva, volunteer National Coordinators, Global Sanitation Fund programme managers, a democratically elected Steering Committee and bi-lateral donor partners. The "national coordinators" worked through WASH Coalitions in 16 countries to lead WSSCC's work. They served as coalition heads, spokespersons, and advocates for sanitation, hygiene and water supply issues.

=== Steering Committee chair ===
WSSCC closed end of 2020. The last chair was Hind Khatib-Othman.

=== Funding ===
WSSCC received funding from several European governments as well as Australia. In 2016-2018 the donors to WSSCC's budget were the Governments of the Netherlands, Norway, Sweden and Switzerland. In previous years, donors also included Australia, Finland, Switzerland and the United Kingdom.

=== Finances ===
The expenditure in 2018 totaled US$18.2 million representing a 72% delivery rate against a budget of US$21.1 million.

=== Partnerships ===
Key collaborating partners with WSSCC included WaterAid, the Sustainable Sanitation Alliance (SuSanA) and UNICEF, among others. In 2020, WSSCC announced a stronger collaboration with SuSanA by merging their Community of Practice group into the SuSanA Discussion Forum.

WSSCC hosted the communications team of Sanitation and Water for all (SWA) until the end of 2019 (from 2020 onwards, it is being hosted by UNICEF).

WSSCC partnered with:

- Global Citizen
- Global Water Partnership (GWP)

== History ==
In 1990, a group of senior staff of developing country governments, bilateral and multilateral agencies, NGOs and research institutions founded WSSCC. On December 21, 1990, the 45th Session of the UN General Assembly elected to pass resolution A/RES/45/181, which emphasized the “importance of intensifying the coordination of national activities undertaken with the assistance of all relevant agencies in the field of water supply and sanitation through, in particular, the inter-agency Steering Committee for Co-operative Action for the International Drinking Water Decade and the Water Supply and Sanitation Collaborative Council”. Through this resolution the WSSCC was formally established as an independent organization with a United Nations mandate.

During the 1990s, WSSCC concentrated on sharing knowledge and convening thematic discussion groups on water- and sanitation-related topics. In 2000, WSSCC published Vision 21, a proposal for achieving universal water, sanitation and hygiene coverage.

From 1991 to 2009, it was hosted by the World Health Organization (WHO). After 2009, WSSCC was hosted by the United Nations Office for Project Services (UNOPS).

After 2000, WSSCC expanded its work to include advocacy and communications, and began to use the term "WASH" as an umbrella term for water, sanitation and hygiene from about 2001 onwards.

WSSCC's members and staff lobbied for a Millennium Development Goal target for sanitation, which was adopted at the World Summit on Sustainable Development in 2002 in Johannesburg, South Africa.

Since 2007, WSSCC focused on sanitation and hygiene, adding a dedicated sanitation grant financing mechanism (the Global Sanitation Fund) in addition to its networking, knowledge and advocacy work.

Previous chairs of the steering committee include: Interim chairs Brad Herbert and Ebele Okeke in 2017–2018, Amina J. Mohammed, Deputy Secretary-General of the United Nations and former Minister of Environment of Nigeria in 2016, Andrew Cotton in 2014 to 2015, Anna Tibaijuka in 2011 to 2013; Roberto Lenton in 2005 to 2010, Sir Richard Jolly in 1997 to 2004 and Margaret Catley-Carlson in 1990 to 1996.

Previous executive directors included Rolf Luyendijk (in 2018), Chris Williams (in 2012 to 2016) and Jon Lane (in 2007 to 2011).

== See also ==
- WASH
- Human right to water and sanitation
- Water issues in developing countries
