= Baby2Baby =

American nonprofit organization

- Formation: 2011; 15 years ago
- Headquarters: Los Angeles, California, U.S.
- Region served: Nationwide
- Co-CEO: Kelly Sawyer Patricof
- Co-CEO: Norah Weinstein

Baby2Baby is an American 501(c)(3) nonprofit organization that provides diapers, formula, clothing and other basic necessities for children living in poverty across the country. Baby2Baby has distributed over 450 million essential items to children in homeless shelters, domestic violence programs, foster care, hospitals, and underserved school districts.

Baby2Baby reaches over one million children in all 50 states and has requests for 1.5 billion diapers from the families they serve. The organization has distributed 200 million diapers and launched its own diaper manufacturing system to make them at 80% less than the retail cost, allowing them to distribute five times more.

== History ==
In 2006, Karis Jagger, Lee Michel, and Marnie Owens established an organization dedicated to recycling baby items for families in need. The organization, Baby2Baby, began as a grassroots effort but later became a community movement.

In 2008, Baby2Baby received the Beyond Shelter Inspiration Award for its impact on homeless and low-income families and children. By 2010, Baby2Baby was working with more than 30 organizations on a monthly basis.

Kelly Sawyer Patricof and Norah Weinstein are the co-CEOs of Baby2Baby and assumed leadership of the organization in 2011.

Baby2Baby gained attention for producing diapers that are 80% cheaper than the retail price.

Baby2Baby's annual Gala has garnered support from business leaders, philanthropists, and celebrities. It is one of four nonprofits that the Duke and Duchess of Sussex suggested people might donate to instead of sending gifts for their newborn son Archie in 2019.

Baby2Baby has formed partnerships across the country from local organizations and diaper banks to large-scale disaster response organizations like the Red Cross. It also has a large network of partners, including celebrity supporters.

== Work ==
The nonprofit's "Disaster Relief and Emergency Response program" has provided 60 million critical items to U.S. families impacted by natural disasters including fires, floods, hurricanes and other crises. in the aftermath of Hurricane Harvey in 2017, Baby2Baby sent 1.1 million items to Texas. Baby2Baby has also delivered millions of critical items to families impacted by the Maui wildfires, flooding in California and tornadoes in Mississippi, Arkansas, and more.

In 2020, Baby2Baby worked with FEMA to distribute baby formula, which was undergoing a shortage in response to the COVID-19 pandemic. Baby2Baby successfully advocated for the removal of the diaper tax in California and several states have followed suit since then.

In 2021, Baby2Baby donated 20 million diapers to establish a diaper bank in New York, providing diapers through food banks throughout the state.

In 2023, Baby2Baby was selected by the White House to pilot a program to combat the maternal mortality crisis and improve maternal mental health in partnership with the Department of Health and Human Services to deliver critical items like diapers, hygiene products, breastfeeding supplies, postpartum care, and educational resources to new moms immediately after giving birth. The program was initially launched in Louisiana, Arkansas, and New Mexico — three states with the highest maternal mortality and child poverty rates — and expanded in 2024 to include California, New York, Texas, Mississippi, Tennessee, Alabama, and Georgia.

In January 2025, following the Los Angeles fires, Baby2Baby provided more than one million diapers, blankets, and other items to families affected by the fires.

As of September 2025, every baby born on Medicaid in New York will receive a Baby2Baby maternal health kit. This follows after a $9 million grant from the state and a 2023 U.S. Department of Health and Human Services pilot program.
