= Kodu Technology =

Kodu Technology is a Ghananian agribusiness startup that is into the production of naturally decomposable sanitary pads from banana and plantain stems. The focus of the company is to reduce period poverty while also impacting smallholder farmers. The pad manufacturing company is located in the capital of the Northern Region of Ghana,Tamale. Their mission aligns with sustainable menstruation and circular economy principles.
