= Myriam Sidibe =

- Born: Myriam Assa Sidibe; Mali
- Education: McGill University (BEng); Loughborough University (MSc); London School of Hygiene & Tropical Medicine (DrPH)
- Occupations: Public health specialist, author
- Known for: Co-founding Global Handwashing Day; Lifebuoy handwashing behaviour-change programme
- Notable work: Brands on a Mission (2020)

Myriam Assa Sidibe is a Malian public health specialist known for her work on handwashing promotion and on the use of commercial brands to drive health behaviour change. While at Unilever, where she led the social mission of the Lifebuoy soap brand, she conceived and helped establish Global Handwashing Day, observed annually on 15 October in more than 100 countries. She is the founder of Brands on a Mission, a Nairobi-based social impact consultancy, and the author of Brands on a Mission: How to Achieve Social Impact and Business Growth Through Purpose (Routledge, 2020).

== Early life and education ==
Sidibe was born in Mali to parents who worked in international development. At the age of 12 she moved with her family to the Congo when her father took a position with the United Nations, and at 15 the family relocated to New York City following his promotion.

She earned a Bachelor of Engineering in bio-systems and agricultural engineering from McGill University in Canada, a master's degree in water and environmental management from Loughborough University in the United Kingdom, and a Doctorate in Public Health from the London School of Hygiene & Tropical Medicine, where her doctoral research focused on handwashing behaviour.

== Career ==
=== Early career ===
Sidibe began her career as an engineer, working on infrastructure in refugee camps in Burundi and East Timor with the International Rescue Committee, and later coordinated a national school health programme in Mali with UNICEF and the Malian Ministry of Health.

=== Unilever and Global Handwashing Day ===
Sidibe joined Unilever in 2006 as Global Social Mission Director for the Lifebuoy soap brand, and from 2015 to 2020 served as the company's Hygiene and Nutrition Social Mission Director for Africa. She led a handwashing behaviour-change programme that Unilever states reached one billion people, described as the largest hygiene behaviour-change programme in the world.

In 2008 she conceived and helped establish Global Handwashing Day with the Global Public–Private Partnership for Handwashing, initially organised with a budget of about US$20,000; the day is now recognised by the UN and observed in over 100 countries each 15 October.

During the COVID-19 pandemic she was a prominent advocate for hygiene promotion in Africa, founding the National Business Compact on Coronavirus in Kenya, a coalition of businesses and public agencies supporting handwashing access, and calling for "public health marketing" approaches to the pandemic.

=== Brands on a Mission ===
In 2020 Sidibe founded Brands on a Mission, a Nairobi-based consultancy and certified B Corp that advises companies on using brands for health and behaviour-change outcomes. The same year she published Brands on a Mission: How to Achieve Social Impact and Business Growth Through Purpose (Routledge), which draws on her Unilever experience to argue that brands can profitably drive public health outcomes; the book received an Axiom Business Book Award in 2021.

=== Academic appointments ===
Sidibe was a senior fellow at the Harvard Kennedy School's Mossavar-Rahmani Center for Business and Government, where her research examined brands as a contribution to public health. She is an Honorary Professor of the Practice at the London School of Hygiene & Tropical Medicine.

She has delivered two TED talks: The Simple Power of Handwashing (2014), which has been viewed more than one million times, and What Sex, Soap and Alcohol Taught Me About Making an Impact (2025), delivered at the TED conference in Vancouver.

== Board memberships ==
Sidibe joined the board of trustees of MSI Reproductive Choices in 2021. She previously served as a trustee of WaterAid (2015–2022) and a board member of the Kilimanjaro Blind Trust (2014–2021), and serves on the board of the AB InBev Foundation.

== Awards and recognition ==
- Axiom Business Book Award for Brands on a Mission (2021)

== Selected publications ==
- Sidibe, Myriam (2020). Brands on a Mission: How to Achieve Social Impact and Business Growth Through Purpose. Routledge. ISBN 978-0367428334.
- "The impact of a school-based hygiene behaviour change intervention on infection and hygiene behaviours in primary schools in Bangladesh: a cluster-randomised controlled trial". Epidemiology and Infection.
- Sidibe, M. "Marketing Meets Mission", Harvard Business Review, May–June 2020.
