= Judy Ling Wong =

Environmental activist

Judy Ling Wong CBE
- Born: 1949 (age 76–77)
- Education: Clyde School; University of Melbourne
- Employer: Black Environment Network

Judy Ling Wong CBE (born 1949) is an environmental activist. For 27 years she was the UK Director of BEN. She is now its Honorary President. She received a CBE in the 2007 Birthday Honours.Judy is a major voice on policy and practice towards social inclusion.

== Early life and education ==
Judy Ling Wong was born and raised in Hong Kong. She moved to Australia, where she attended Clyde School. She studied architecture at the University of Melbourne. In 1972 Ling Wong moved to Europe, and lived in West Berlin where she worked as a painter.

== Career ==
Judy Ling Wong moved to Britain in 1974. She worked as a painter, dancer and poet. She wrote a series of books, on nursery rhymes and ballet. She is based in London.

In 1987 she established the Black Environment Network (BEN), building relationships between people from ethnic minorities and the built environment. In 1990 the BEN merged with the Ethnic Minority Award Scheme (EMAS), with BEN becoming more of a political project. Ling Wong has encouraged more people from minority ethnic backgrounds to visit the countryside. BEN championed the message that countryside access is not an access issue but a rights issue, challenging the notion that the English countryside is a "white space". Ling Wong worked to emphasise the relationship between environmentalism and the countryside. The National Alliance of Women's Organisations investigated rural racism and its intersection with gender. She advocates for access to nature and equality of opportunity to environmental participation within the urban environment where most ethnic minorities live.

She services on the advisory board of the University of Gloucestershire Countryside and Community Research Institute. She is a co-founder of the National Park City Foundation and was a member of the steering group for the movement to make London a national park city. She chairs the Green Apprenticeships Advisory Group, supporting the BEIS Green Recovery Taskforce. Judy delivered the 2019 Grantham Institute for Climate Change and the Environment Lecture at Imperial College London.

=== Awards and honours ===
Her awards and honours include;

- 2000 Order of the British Empire for services to the environment
- 2005 University of Gloucestershire Honorary Doctorate
- 2007 Commander of the British Empire for services to heritage
- 2013 Honorary Fellowship Institution of Environmental Sciences
- 2014 Honorary Fellowship Society for the Environment
- 2017 Women's Environment Network Ambassador
- 2020 Included in the BBC Radio 4 Woman's Hour Power list 2020. Patron Population Matters

• Patron CIEEM
