= Voluntary Action for Development =

- Abbreviation: VAD
- Type: Non-governmental organization (NGO)
- Registration no.: NOMIA/NB/1996/09/3545
- Legal status: Non-profit organization
- Purpose: Rural development, food security, economic empowerment, education, health promotion, WASH
- Headquarters: Uganda
- Region served: Wakiso District, Mpigi District, and North Eastern Uganda

Voluntary Action for Development is a Ugandan non-governmental organization (NGO) that works with the rural poor and disadvantaged communities of Wakiso, Mpigi and the North Eastern districts of Uganda. It is also known as VAD for its short form.

Voluntary Action for Development (VAD) is a Ugandan non-governmental organization (NGO) that works with rural poor and disadvantaged communities in Wakiso, Mpigi, and the North Eastern districts of Uganda. Established and registered as a non-profit organization in 1996, VAD focuses on improving livelihoods through food security, family economic empowerment, vocational and business skills development, education support, and health promotion.

== Areas of focus ==
- Agriculture, aquaculture, and forestry
- Education and training
- Environment and climate change
- Financial accessibility and management
- HIV/AIDS, tuberculosis (TB), malaria, health and medical services

== Key program areas ==
- Health promotion
- Community Water, Hygiene and Sanitation (WASH)
- School Water, Hygiene and Sanitation (SWASH)
- WASH at local health centers
- Menstrual hygiene management for adolescent girls and pupils

== Target beneficiaries ==
- Children
- Women
- Youth
- Persons with disabilities (PWDs)
- Elderly people
- People living with HIV/AIDS

It was established and registered as a non-profit organization in 1996, their registration number is NOMIA/NB/1996/09/3545 and their permit number is INDP 16153545NB.

Voluntary Action for Development mainly aims to improve livelihoods through food security and family economic empowerment, Vocational skilling and business skills development, also enhancing education through infrastructure development, school feeding promotions which in return improve students performance in schools.

Its main targets are;

- Children
- Women
- Youth
- PWDs
- Elderly
- People living with HIV/AIDs

The main global issues VAD mainly focuses on are:

- Agriculture, aquaculture and forestry
- Education and training
- Environment and climate change
- Financial accessibility and Management
- HIV/AIDS, TB(Tuberculosis), Malaria, Health and Medical

The key program areas are as follows:

- Health promotion
- Community Water Hygiene and Sanitation(WASH)
- School water Hygiene and Sanitation(SWASH)
- WASH at Local Health Centers
- Menstrual hygiene management in adolescent girls/pupils
