= Aditi Gupta =

Indian author

- Born: Garhwa, Jharkhand, India
- Education: National Institute of Design
- Occupations: Author and co-founder of Menstrupedia Comic
- Spouse: Tuhin Paul
- Writing career
- Genre: Menstrupedia Comic
- Website: www.menstrupedia.com

Aditi Gupta (Hindi: अदिति गुप्ता) is an Indian author and co-founder of Menstrupedia Comic. She and her husband, both National Institute of Design Alumni, co-founded Menstrupedia Comic in 2012. In 2014, she was named in the Forbes India 30 Under 30 2014 list.

== Early life ==
Aditi Gupta is an engineering graduate and a post-graduate in new media design from the National Institute of Design, Ahmedabad. She was born in Garhwa in Jharkhand, India. Aditi met her husband, Tuhin Paul, in the National Institute of Design where they both worked on several projects together. They found a severe lack of awareness about menstruation even among the most educated people, and that many still believed and followed menstrual myths. Drawing from her experiences during her teen-age she started Menstrupedia.

She started menstruating at the age of 12, however, she was not taught about menstruation in school until the age of 15, like other schools in India. She had to also abide by the age-old traditions while menstruating, such as, not being allowed to touch a place of worship, or to sit on other people’s beds; and having to wash and dry her clothes separately. Additionally, she was not allowed to use the sanitary napkins available in the market as buying them would jeopardize the family’s dignity. She bought her first sanitary napkin at the age of 15.

== Career ==
The lack of awareness and education about menstruation motivated her to undergo research on the subject for one year. She collated information from doctors and girls which gave her an idea to start a comic book with three young girls and a doctor as the main characters. She put up the comic books on a website (www.talesofchange.in). In November 2012, Gupta and her husband, Paul started Menstrupedia to spread more knowledge and awareness about the subject. It originally began as a thesis project while they were in National Institute of Design, Ahmedabad. The website has developed into a platform ‘providing information on puberty and sexuality for pre-teens and teenagers.’

Menstrupedia provides a user-friendly guide to menstruation, hygiene and puberty and helps break myths associated to them. The aim of the website is to present this information in a culturally sensitive and an easy-to-understand way through digital media. The website contains various comic books, blogs, Q&A section and a Learn section. As of 2018, the comics are available in fourteen languages and have been utilised in more than 18 countries. Gupta prepared the materials used in schools in five states of North India currently. Gupta distributed these comics, in schools in Mehsana, Gandhinagar, Ahmedabad and Ranchi, where the girls, their parents and teachers liked them a lot. Menstrupedia has started several campaigns in collaboration with Whisper India such as Touch the Pickle movement in collaboration with many actresses like Shraddha Kapoor, Parineeti Chopra, Kalki Koechlin, Neha Dhupia, Mandira Bedi among others. She was listed on the Forbes India U-30 list.

Menstrupedia receives one hundred thousand visitors every month. Her comic books have been used by NGOs like Protsahan, Munshi Jagannath Bhagwan Smriti Sansthan, Instincts, Kanha along with two Buddhists monasteries in Ladakh.
