= Diaper need =

Struggle to provide a sufficient number of clean diapers

Diaper need is the struggle to provide a sufficient number of clean diapers to ensure that each diaper user can be changed out of wet or soiled diapers as often as necessary. An adequate supply of diapers is a basic need for all infants, as necessary for health and well-being as food and shelter. Adults and older children experiencing incontinence may also suffer from diaper need if they or their caretakers cannot acquire an adequate supply.

== Economic issues ==
Diaper need for infants and toddlers is a widespread issue. 1 in 3 mothers in the U.S. struggle to afford diapers. A study of families in the U.S. and Canada reports that mothers have had to cut back on other necessities including food, utilities and childcare in order to cover the costs of diapers.

=== U.S. government assistance ===
While diapers are not an allowable expense for federal assistance through programs such as the Women, Infant and Children's Program (WIC) and the Supplemental Nutritional Assistance Program (SNAP), Temporary Assistance for Needy Families (TANF) falls short of helping parents in the U.S. afford diapers. The first and only city-government subsidized program in the U.S. to address diaper need by distributing diapers monthly to families was developed in San Francisco in 2015.

==== Barrier to work and education ====
Although some states provide working parents with child care subsidy, this does not include funds for diapers, which the majority of early child care programs require parents to provide in order for a child to attend. A mother who cannot afford diapers may be forced to keep her child out of the daycare program. Not having enough diapers to supply a child care provider may also create problems for mothers attending educational or training programs.

==== Disparity in wages ====
Although the participation of many low-income single parents in the labor market has increased, their earnings and wages have remained low, and their employment is concentrated in low-wage occupations and industries. A single mother of one child working full-time and earning the federal minimum wage will spend over 6% of her gross salary on diapers.

==== Increased costs for lower earners ====
Families living below or near the poverty line in the United States often pay more for diapers in absolute terms than families at higher income levels. Less cash flow forces poor parents to purchase diapers in smaller quantities, at higher prices per diaper. Additionally, limited and less flexible time and transportation may prohibit trips to stores that offer savings for consumers who buy diapers in larger quantities.

== Health issues ==
Without an adequate supply of diapers, families may provide less frequent diaper changes in order to stretch out their diaper supplies. In a 2013 study commissioned by Feeding America, 48% of families report delay changing diapers and 32% of families report reusing diapers.

For infants and toddlers, less frequent diaper changes can lead to increased instances of diaper rash and urinary tract infections, which can hospitalize the baby. When parents cannot afford diapers, they resort to leaving their child in a diaper for much longer than they should. Some parents will leave their child in a wet or dirty diaper, and other parents will “clean” a used disposable diaper and then put it on their baby many times. Some parents also attempt to potty train their baby as young as less than one year old, whereas diaper manufacturers claim most children should not be potty trained until they are two or three years old. Furthermore, the experience of diapering has been identified as a significant conduit for mother-infant bonding and a source of confidence for mothers. Parents' inability to provide adequate diaper changes has been linked to parenting stress and maternal depression. In households where parents experience high levels of stress and depression, children are at greater risk of social, emotional and behavioral problems.

== Response ==
The major efforts to alleviate diaper need come through the work of diaper banks and a growing diaper bank movement consisting of individuals and organizations that mobilize a network of community, state, and national level agencies and institutions to address the issue. According to the National Diaper Bank Network, a nonprofit organization that helps other nonprofit organizations start diaper banks in their communities and has tracked the organized response to diaper need since 2012, the number of diaper banks in the U.S. has increased five-fold in three years.

Diaper drives are organized by diaper banks, other organizations, and individuals to collect diaper donations. Diaper banks also raise funds to purchase diapers and distribute free disposable and cloth diapers to families experiencing diaper need.

== Populations at risk ==
=== U.S. demographics ===
In the United States, there are over 5.5 million infants and toddlers in low-income families. Nearly half of them are living in poverty. Many of these families face multiple demographic and familial risks.

=== Adults and older children ===
Urinary incontinence affects approximately 13 million persons in the United States, with as many as 25 million experiencing transient or ongoing incontinence. Most of these people are older adults, many of whom may be living on limited incomes with limited buying power once medical expenses are factored in. In addition, many disabled people are obliged to wear diapers for a variety of reasons, incontinence and inability to use a bathroom unaided among the most common.

Often, people dealing with incontinence problems are among those who have the fewest resources. According to the Cornell University Online Resource for U.S. Disability Statistics in 2009, an estimated 26.4% percent of the population between 21 and 64 with a disability had incomes below the poverty line. These numbers only include people with disabilities who are living independently, either alone or with family – not those who are institutionalized and have greater access to care.

Though the official census data gives seniors a 2013 poverty rate of only 9.5%, the Supplemental Poverty Measure, which accounts for expenses such as the rising costs of health care, raises the American senior poverty rate to 14.6%.

== See also ==
- Poverty in the United States
- Basic needs
- Maslow's hierarchy of needs
- Diapers
- Cloth diapers
- Toilet training
- Child care
- Pediatrics
- Child poverty
- Children's rights
- Cost of raising a child
