= George S. James =

George S. James, an American inventor, patented the 'sanitary waste disposal bin' in New York in April 1952, calling it "a convenient method for the disposal of sanitary napkins." He designed it to have a hinged opening in the cover.
