= Cannon Hygiene =

British company

Cannon Hygiene was a British family-owned company, established in the 1950s, that arranged hygiene services including providing sanitary bins.
