= International Day of Action for Women's Health =

International observance

- Observed by: Worldwide
- Type: International
- Date: 28 May
- Next time: 28 May 2027
- Frequency: annual

The International Day of Action for Women's Health is an international observance celebrated on May 28 every year since 1987.

== See also ==
- International Day for the Elimination of Violence against Women
- International Women's Day
- Menstrual Hygiene Day (May 28)
