= Norah Weinstein =

Co-CEO of Baby2Baby

Norah Weinstein is an American businesswoman and Co-CEO of the non-profit Baby2Baby.

She and her co-CEO Kelly Sawyer Patricof were named as one of Time's 100 Most Influential People of 2024.

== Early life and education ==
Weinstein's father is an Orthodox Jew from The Bronx, while her mother is from Memphis, Tennessee. Weinstein was raised attending Wilshire Boulevard Temple in Los Angeles.

She earned a Bachelor of Arts from UC Berkeley, and a Juris Doctor at the University of Southern California.

== Career ==
She interned for Bill Clinton during his presidency and went on to work as a corporate lawyer.

Weinstein and Kelly Sawyer Patricof are the Co-CEOS of the Los-Angeles nonprofit Baby2Baby. The nonprofit was founded in 2011, and provides a "wide range of necessities" for families with newborns. It gained attention for producing diapers for 80% cheaper than the retail price.

The nonprofit worked with the New York governor's office to distribute 20 million diapers at food banks in the state. Its "disaster relief and emergency response program" allows it to distribute necessities to families in the U.S. who are impacted by natural disasters; in the aftermath of Hurricane Harvey in 2017, Baby2Baby sent 1.1 million items to Texas.

In 2020, Baby2Baby worked with FEMA to distribute baby formula, which was undergoing a shortage in response to the COVID-19 pandemic. They were recognized as one of the 10 most innovative nonprofits by Fast Company and made Fast Company's World-Changing Idea List.

She was involved in eliminating the tax on diapers in California, working with Governor Gavin Newsom. Weinstein said, "I think when people are paying $70 to $80 per month per baby on diapers, and when they are the fourth highest expenditure after food and rent and utilities, it’s not small."

Patricof and Weinstein host a yearly gala which has raised millions for their non-profit.

She's spoken at Fast Company's Innovation Festival and South by Southwest (SXSW). She's been named one of CNBC's "Changemakers".

Together with Kelly Sawyer Patricof and Baby2Baby Ambassador Jessica Alba, she co-wrote the children's book A Bear to Share.

== Personal life ==
She resides in Los Angeles, California, with her husband Brian and their two children. She met Brian in law school. They became engaged in 2002 and got married 10 months later. She met Patricof on a "double blind date" with their husbands.
