= National Diaper Bank Network =

U.S. nonprofit organization

- Abbreviation: NDBN
- Formation: 2011
- Type: Nonprofit
- Legal status: Charity Organization
- Headquarters: 470 James St #007; New Haven, Connecticut
- Coordinates: 41°18′22″N 72°55′30″W
- Region served: United States
- Members: More than 300 basic needs banks
- Official language: English
- CEO: Joanne Samuel Goldblum
- Main organ: Board of Directors
- Affiliations: Alliance for Period Supplies
- Website: nationaldiaperbanknetwork.org

The National Diaper Bank Network is a United States-based non-profit organization that is dedicated to ensuring that every child in the U.S. has an adequate supply of diapers to remain clean, dry and healthy. NDBN is a nationwide network of independently operating diaper banks and pantries that collect and distribute over 30 million diapers for children experiencing diaper need.

== History ==
In 2010, the founders of The Diaper Bank (North Haven, Connecticut), Westside Baby (Seattle), the Diaper Bank of Southern Arizona (Tucson, Arizona), and the St. Paul Diaper Bank Partnership (McHenry, Illinois), along with Huggies formed the National Diaper Bank Network (NDBN) to create national dialog on the collective impact of diaper banks in addressing a most basic need of babies, access to clean diapers.

== Diaper bank movement ==
The diaper bank movement began in 1994 when Resolve, Inc., a small consulting firm in Tucson, held a diaper drive during the holiday season to assist a local crisis nursery. Encouraged by the enthusiastic response, and the subsequent demand for emergency diaper assistance, the firm gained an understanding of how the community could come together and help solve a problem. The executives at Resolve made the December Diaper Drive an annual tradition, and within five years they were collecting 300,000 diapers during drive and distributed the diapers to families at 30 local social service agencies. In 2000, the diaper drive effort was spun off into an independent nonprofit organization, the Diaper Bank of Southern Arizona, the nation's first diaper bank.

In 2004, Joanne Samuel Goldblum, a social worker in New Haven, Connecticut, adopted the Arizona model to found The New Haven Diaper Bank (now Diaper Bank of Connecticut) in response to the desperate need for diapers that she witnessed in her work with impoverished families. Initially creating and operating the fledgling organization from her home Goldblum went on to establish the nation's largest diaper bank. Today, The Diaper Bank of Connecticut distributes more than 2.5 million clean diapers annually to struggling families throughout Connecticut.

The success of these two diaper banks inspired similar efforts throughout the country. With growing awareness of diaper need, small but passionate groups responded. Some groups held diaper drives, others went on to found independent diaper banks in their communities, often through their churches, and/or as an extension of existing poverty-related relief agencies.

== Network programs ==
Through awareness, assistance, and community, the National Diaper Bank Network (NDBN) is dedicated to helping individuals, children and families access the basic necessities they require to thrive and reach their full potential.

NDBN's strategic priorities include:

Ending diaper need, period poverty, and the lack of access to other material basic necessities in the U.S., and maintaining and expanding NDBN’s position as the recognized authority on issues and solutions related to the lack of material basic necessities. Advancing public policy solutions through advocacy, legislation, research & evaluation. Building the capacity of our national network to end diaper need, period poverty, and lack of access to material basic necessities in the U.S. supporting the development and expansion of community-based basic needs banks throughout the country. Sustaining NDBN’s organizational strength, strong reputation and financial health to end diaper need, period poverty, and the lack of access to other material basic necessities in the U.S.

On May 1, 2018, NDBN launched the Alliance for Period Supplies, with about 50 allied programs nationwide. The program aims to make menstrual supplies free or affordable to all who need them. The National Diaper Bank Network hosts an annual conference - The US Conference on Poverty and Basic Needs. The conference takes place in October. NDBN also hosts 2 national awareness weeks. National Diaper Need Awareness Week takes place in September and Period Poverty Awareness Week takes place in May.
