= Menstrual Hygiene Day =

Annual awareness day

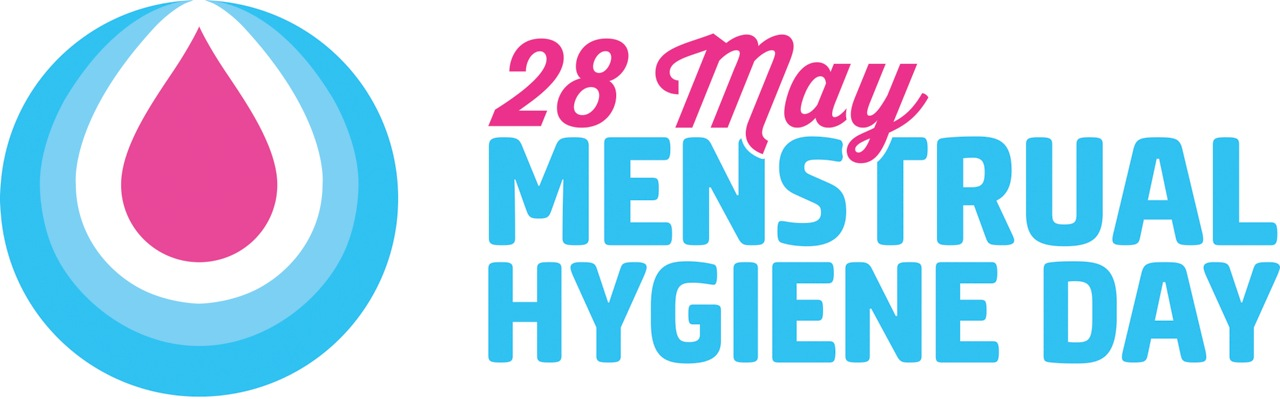
- Also called: MHD or MH Day
- Observed by: people worldwide
- Type: International
- Significance: To break taboos surrounding menstruation, raise awareness of the importance of good menstrual hygiene management worldwide.
- Date: May 28
- Frequency: annual
- First time: May 28, 2014
- Related to: Global Handwashing Day

Menstrual Hygiene Day (MHD, MH Day in short) is an annual awareness day on May 28 to highlight the importance of good menstrual hygiene management (MHM) at a global level. It was initiated by the German-based NGO WASH United in 2013 and observed for the first time in 2014.

In developing countries, women's choices of menstrual hygiene materials are often limited by the costs, availability and social norms. Adequate sanitation facilities and access to feminine hygiene products are important but opening discussion making adequate education for women and girls is of equal importance. Research has found that not having access to menstrual hygiene management products can keep girls home from school during their period each month.

Menstrual Hygiene Day is an occasion for publicizing information in the media, including social media, and to engage decision-makers in policy dialogue. The day aims to advocate for the integration of menstrual hygiene management into global, national and local policies and programs.

== Background ==
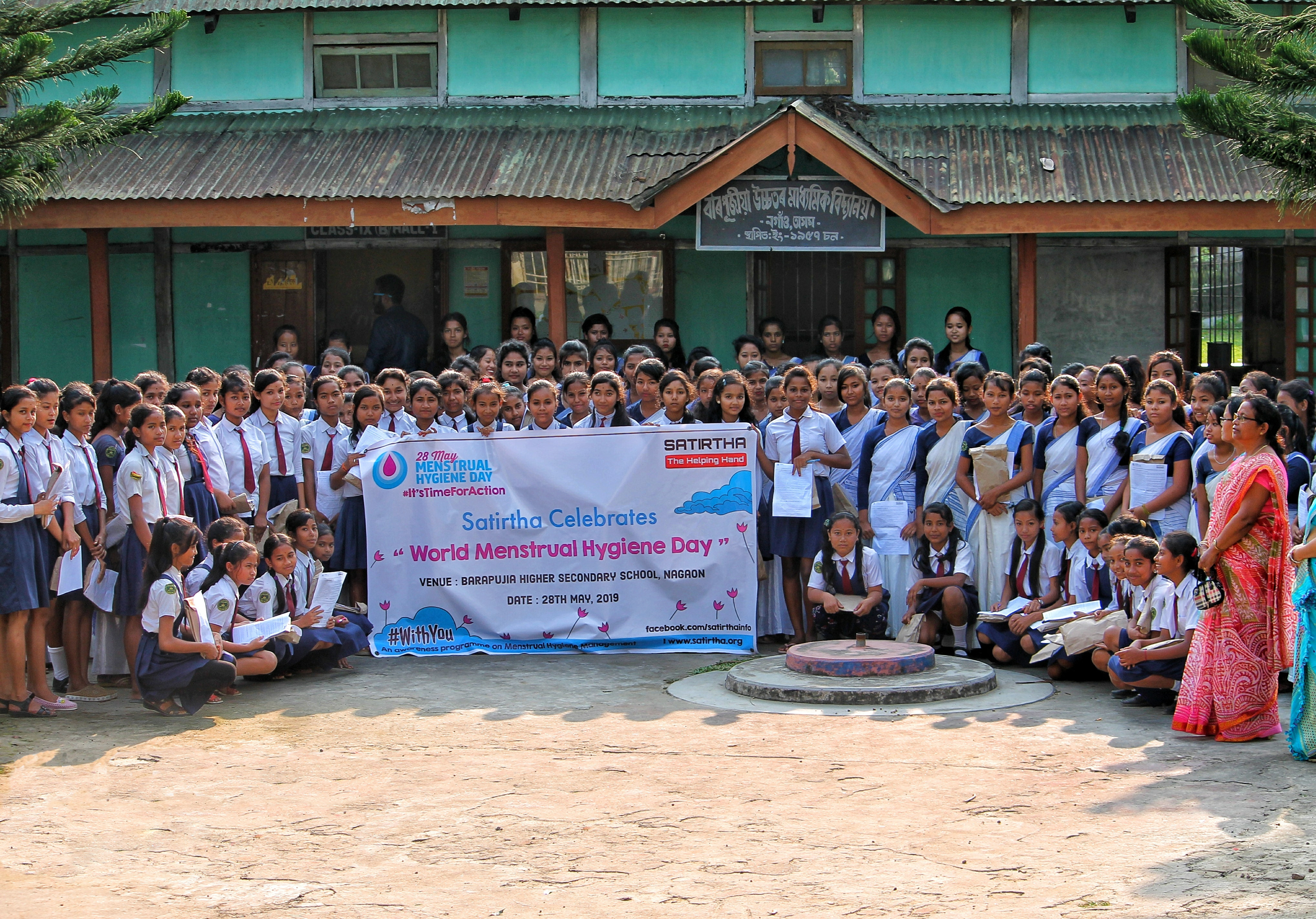
'Satirtha - The Helping Hand' a non profit organization based in North Eastern state of Assam in India is working for a period friendly environment for adolescent girls and women in the region

Celebration of Menstrual Hygiene Day in Uganda

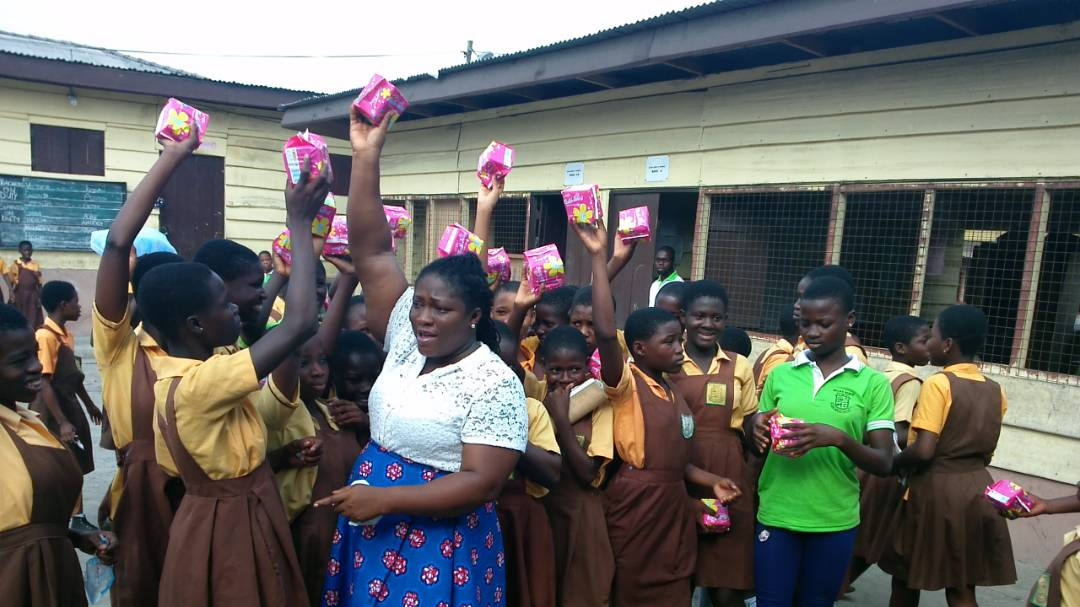
Female leaders in one urban poor community in Accra (Ghana) plan and implement menstrual health programs in schools, May 2018.

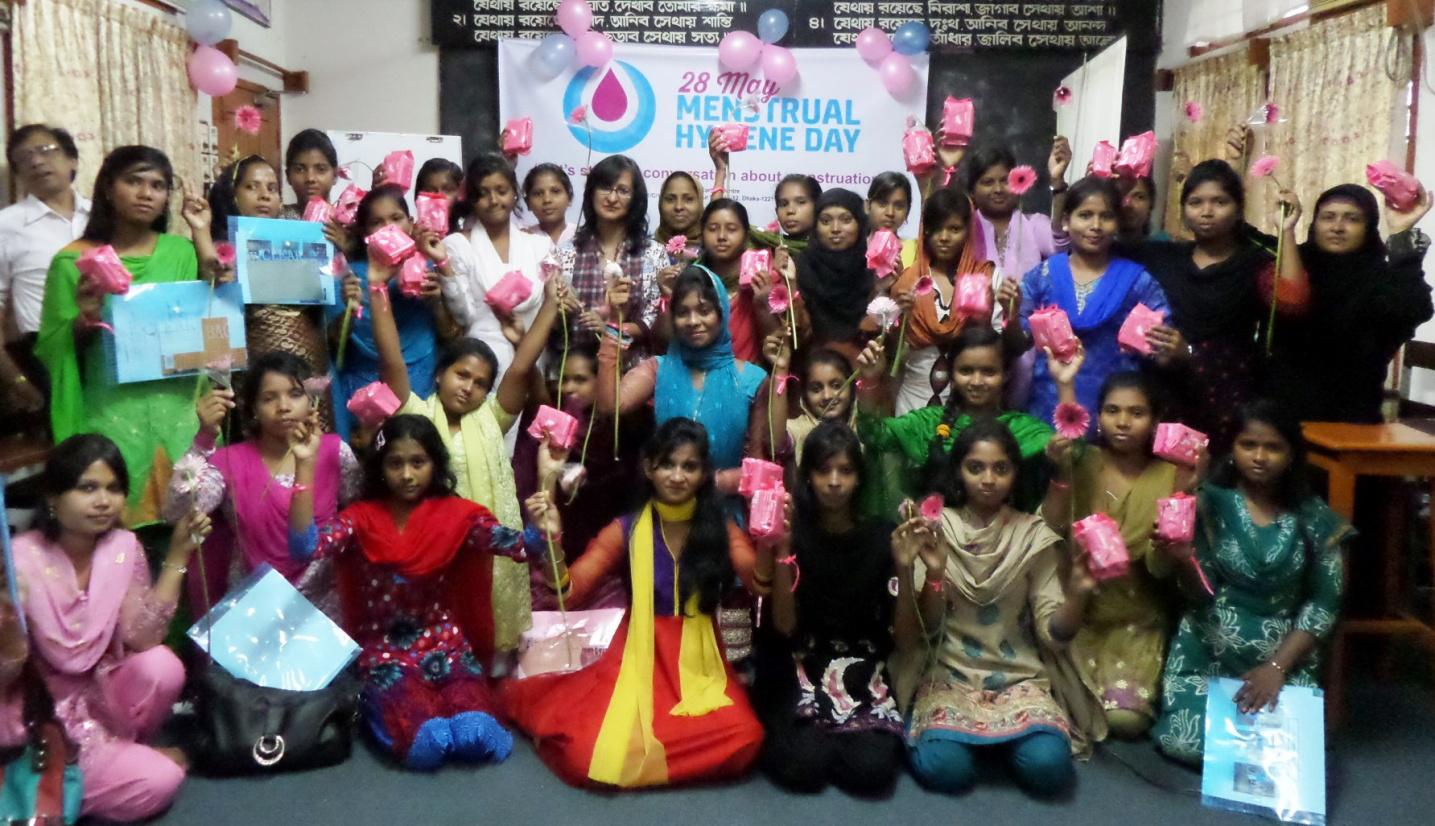
Celebration of Menstrual Hygiene Day in Bangladesh

Menstrual hygiene management can be particularly challenging for females in developing countries, where clean water and toilet facilities are often inadequate. In addition, traditional cultures make it difficult to discuss menstruation openly. This limits access to relevant and important information about the normal functions of the female body. This directly affects their health, education and dignity. Access to information can be considered a human right.

=== History ===
In 2012, several organizations involved in public health began to break the silence on MHM and turn their attention to the issue globally, including grassroots organizers, social entrepreneurs and United Nations agencies.

In May 2013, WASH United used a 28-day social media campaign, for example on Twitter, called "May #MENSTRAVAGANZA" to generate awareness about menstruation and MHM as important considerations within water, sanitation and hygiene (WASH) development initiatives. Those involved with the social media campaign, including WASH Advocates, Girls' Globe and Ruby Cup, were encouraged by the positive feedback for the "May #MENSTRAVAGANZA" and they decided to create a global awareness day for menstruation.

On 28 May 2014, many people around the world celebrated Menstrual Hygiene Day for the first time with rallies, exhibitions, movie screenings, workshops and speeches. There were 145 partners involved with the first MHD.

For 2015, a hashtag campaign on social media lent a light-hearted look at challenging societal norms with the tag #IfMenHadPeriods. The campaign by WaterAid, released in time for Menstrual Hygiene Awareness Day, created videos "spoof ads" where men are proud of having their periods and used "Manpons" instead of tampons. The campaign helped "raise awareness about women who don't have access to 'safe water, hygiene and sanitation,' when their monthly visitor comes along." Another aspect of the campaign is that it helped bring men into the conversation so that they could "help tackle the stigma in largely patriarchal societies and encourage women and girls to embrace their cycle with pride instead of shame." In Uganda, 2015 celebrations kicked off with a march to Parliament where a charter on MHM was signed and then the march continued to the National theatre for presentations by primary and secondary schools.

== Objectives ==
=== Raising awareness ===
Menstrual hygiene day is meant to serve as a platform to bring together individuals, organizations, social businesses and the media to create a united and strong voice for women and girls. It is designed to break the silence about menstrual hygiene management.

The objectives of MHD include:

- To address the challenges and hardships many women and girls face during their menstruation.
- To highlight the positive and innovative solutions being taken to address these challenges.
- To catalyze a growing, global movement that recognizes and supports girls' and women's rights and build partnerships among those partners on national and local level.
- To engage in policy dialogue and actively advocate for the integration of menstrual hygiene management (MHM) into global, national and local policies and programs.
- To create an occasion for media work, including social media.

Menstrual Hygiene Day also promotes gender equality and the value of girls' education.

May 28 has symbolic meaning: May is the 5th month of the year, and the average length of menstruation is 5 days every month. Also, the menstrual cycle averages 28 days.

=== Government accountability ===
For partners working in developing countries, the day is not only an opportunity to raise awareness, but also to strengthen government accountability related to MHM issues. For example, in 2015 the Ministry of Health in Kenya launched a national MHM strategy. Kenya, jointly with UNICEF, held a virtual conference on Menstrual Hygiene Management in Schools that same year.

== See also ==
- Global Handwashing Day (15 October)
- Human right to water and sanitation
- International Day of Action for Women's Health
- Lists of special days: List of awareness days, List of commemorative days
- Sustainable Development Goal 6
- World Toilet Day (19 November)
