= Kelly Sawyer Patricof =

Canadian-American businesswoman

Kelly Sawyer Patricof is a Canadian-American businesswoman and philanthropist. She was named as one of Time's 100 Most Influential People of 2024.

== Career ==
Patricof was a model in New York City, where she realized the needs of low-income families while volunteering. She is the creative director of Satine Boutique and made the Create & Cultivate 100.

Patricof co-wrote the children's book A Bear to Share.

She's been profiled by LaLigne, Rent the Runway, and the book 100 Making a Difference.

=== Baby2Baby ===
Patricof and Norah Weinstein are the co-CEOS of the Los-Angeles nonprofit Baby2Baby. The nonprofit was founded in 2011, and provides a "wide range of necessities" for families with newborns. It gained attention for producing diapers for 80% cheaper than the retail price. The nonprofit worked with the New York governor's office to distribute 20 million diapers at food banks in the state. Its "disaster relief and emergency response program" allows it to distribute necessities to families in the U.S. who are impacted by natural disasters; in the aftermath of Hurricane Harvey in 2017, Baby2Baby sent 1.1 million items to Texas. In 2020, Baby2Baby worked with FEMA to distribute baby formula, which was undergoing a shortage in response to the COVID-19 pandemic. They were recognized as one of the 10 most innovative nonprofits by Fast Company and made Fast Company's World-Changing Idea List.

Patricof and Weinstein host a yearly gala which has raised millions for their non-profit.

Patricof and Weinstein successfully lobbied California Governor Gavin Newsom to eliminate the state's sales tax on diapers.

In 2023, she was a speaker at the 30/50 Summit.

== Personal life ==
Patricof was born in London. She grew up in Vancouver.

She lives with her husband and two children in Los Angeles, California.
