= Global Handwashing Day =

Campaign to promote handwashing habits

- Emblem used for Global Handwashing Day around the world. Shown in the image is water, soap, and a hand.
- Celebrations: "Our hands, our future!"
- Date: 15 October
- Next time: 15 October 2027
- Frequency: Annual
- First time: 15 October 2008
- Related to: Menstrual hygiene day

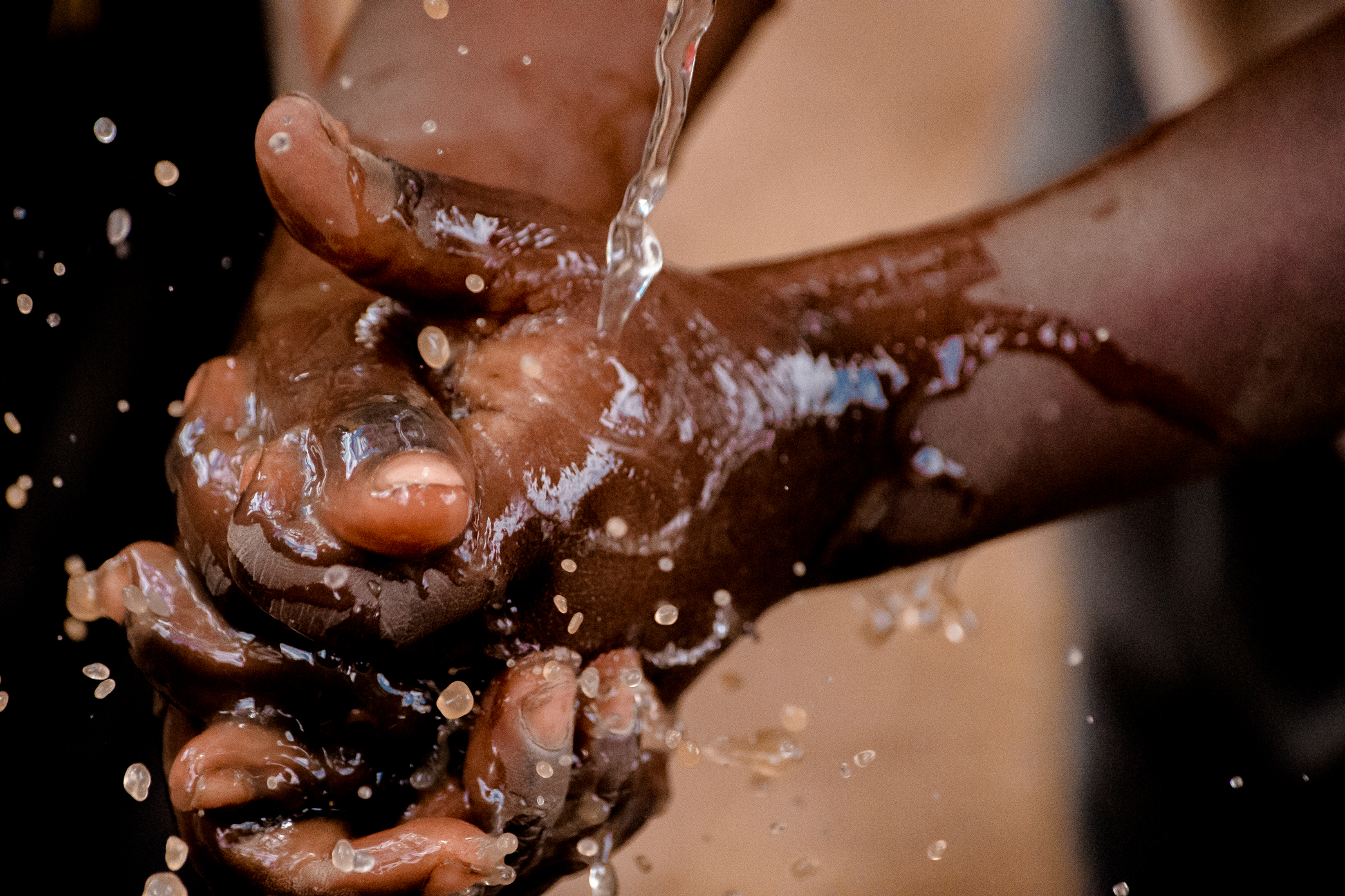
Handwashing

Global Handwashing Day (GHD) is an international hand washing promotion campaign to motivate and mobilize people around the world to improve their hand washing habits. Washing hands at critical points both during the day and washing with soap are important. In 2008, Global Handwashing Day was celebrated for the first time. This day aims to make people around the world aware of the importance of washing their hands with soap in order to prevent diseases and infections. To commemorate this day, over 120 million children in 70 countries were encouraged to practice handwashing with soap. Since then, the movement has built momentum, garnering support from various stakeholders such as governments, schools, NGOs, and private firms.

Global Hand washing Day occurs on 15 October of every year. The global campaign is dedicated to raising awareness of hand-washing with soap as a key factor to disease prevention. With proper handwashing, respiratory and intestinal diseases can be reduced significantly.

== Implementation and management ==
The Global Handwashing Partnership (GHP) (formerly called "Public Private Partnership for Handwashing" (PPPHW)) established Global Handwashing Day in 2008 to promote a global and local vision of handwashing with soap.

Steering Committee members of the GHP include Colgate-Palmolive; FHI 360; The London School of Hygiene and Tropical Medicine; Procter & Gamble; UNICEF; Unilever; University at Buffalo; USAID; the Water and Sanitation Program at the World Bank; and the Water Supply and Sanitation Collaborative Council.

Continued research on handwashing habits and practices has been commissioned in conjunction with GHD. In 2011, Svenska Cellulosa Aktiebolaget (SCA), sponsored a study to assess the handwashing habits of American and Canadian adults, finding that many were not using soap when washing their hands.

=== Aims ===
The stated aims of Global Handwashing Day are to:

- Foster and support a general culture of handwashing with soap in all societies
- Shine a spotlight on the state of handwashing in each country
- Raise awareness about the benefits of handwashing with soap.

== Activities ==
Each year, over 200 million people celebrate Global Handwashing Day.

== Examples ==
- On 15 October 2014, Madhya Pradesh, an Indian state, won the Guinness World Record for the most massive handwashing program. There were 1,276,425 children in 51 different districts participating.
- Sometimes, groups choose to celebrate GHD on other dates than 15 October. In Ethiopia, 300 people celebrated Global Handwashing Day in Addis Ababa on 1 November in 2013.
- On 15 October 2015, Lupok Central Elementary School, Guiuan Eastern Samar, Philippines, celebrated the Global Handwashing Day by doing the proper handwashing before starting classes.

== History ==
Global Handwashing Day was initiated by the Global Handwashing Partnership (GHP) in August 2008 at the annual World Water Week in Stockholm, Sweden. This means that the first Global Handwashing Day took place on 15 October 2008. The date was appointed by the UN General Assembly. The year 2008 was also the International Year of Sanitation. The founding bodies in 2008 included: FHI360 (a nonprofit human development organization based in the US), US Centers for Disease Control and Prevention, Procter & Gamble, UNICEF, Unilever, World Bank Water & Sanitation Program and the United States Agency for International Development.

=== Themes for annual Global Handwashing Day ===
- 2025 - Be a handwashing hero!
- 2024 - Why are clean hands still important?
- 2023 - Clean Hands are Within Reach
- 2022 - Unite for Universal Hand Hygiene
- 2021 - Our Future Is at Hand – Let's Move Forward Together.
- 2020 - Hand Hygiene for All.
- 2019 - Clean Hands for All. In the US, the US CDC used the theme Life is Better with Clean Hands and launched throughout the USA a national hand hygiene campaign targeting adults who are parents and caregivers in communicating the importance of handwashing before cooking at home and after using the bathroom when out in public. They used ideas such as 'Handwashing: a family activity' and 'Handwashing: A healthy habit in the kitchen' when focusing on parents' educational roles with their children.
- 2018 - Clean hands - a recipe for health.
- 2017 - Our hands, our future.
- 2016 - Make handwashing a habit.
- 2015 - Raise a hand for hygiene.
- 2014 - Clean hands save lives. In 2014, Global Handwashing Day was used as an opportunity to fight Ebola. In Nigeria, for example, Concern Universal and Carex sponsored events featuring singer Sunny Neji.
- 2013 - The power is in your hands.
- 2012 - I am a handwashing advocate.
- 2011 - Clean hands save lives.
- 2010 - Children and Schools.
- 2009 - Spread the word, not the germs.
- 2008 - The focus for Global Handwashing Day's inaugural year in 2008 was school children. In that year, the members pledged to get the maximum number of school children handwashing with soap in more than 70 countries. In India in 2008, cricket legend Sachin Tendulkar and his teammates joined an estimated 100 million schoolchildren around the country in lathering up for better health and hygiene as part of the first Global Handwashing Day.

== Background ==
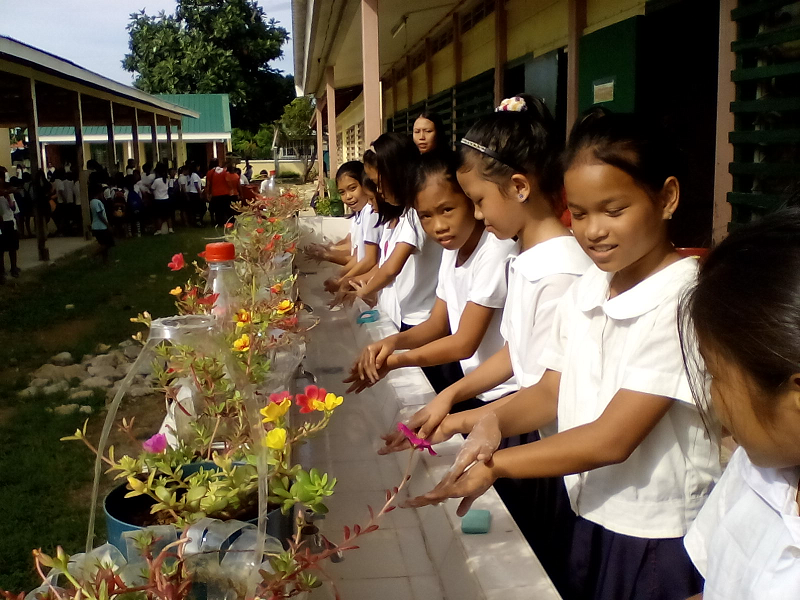
Pupils of Lupok Central Elementary School Guiuan Eastern Samar, Philippines during the Global Hand Washing Day Celebration in 2015

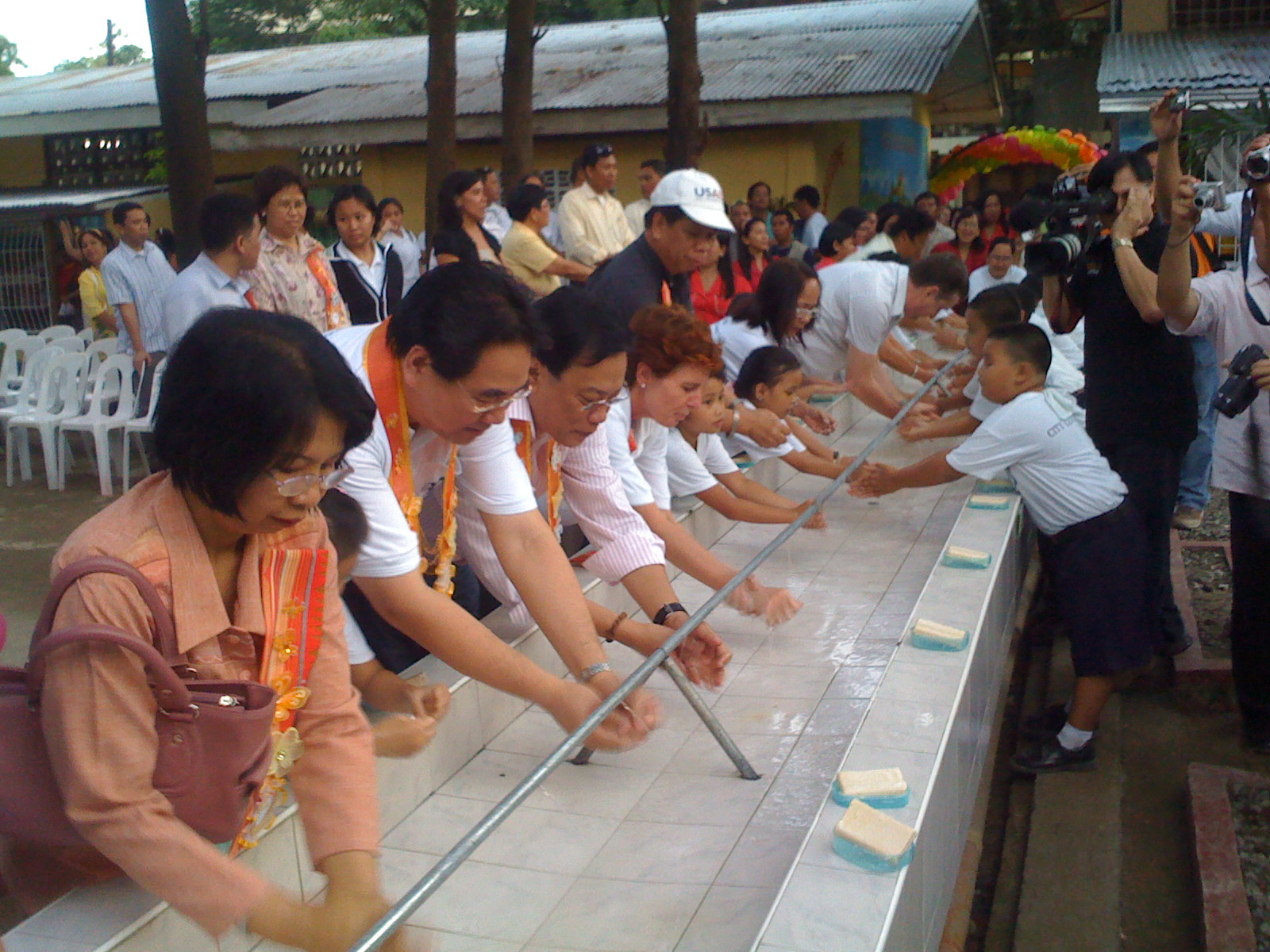
Global Handwashing Day 2008 celebrations with celebrities at City Central School in Cagayan de Oro, Philippines

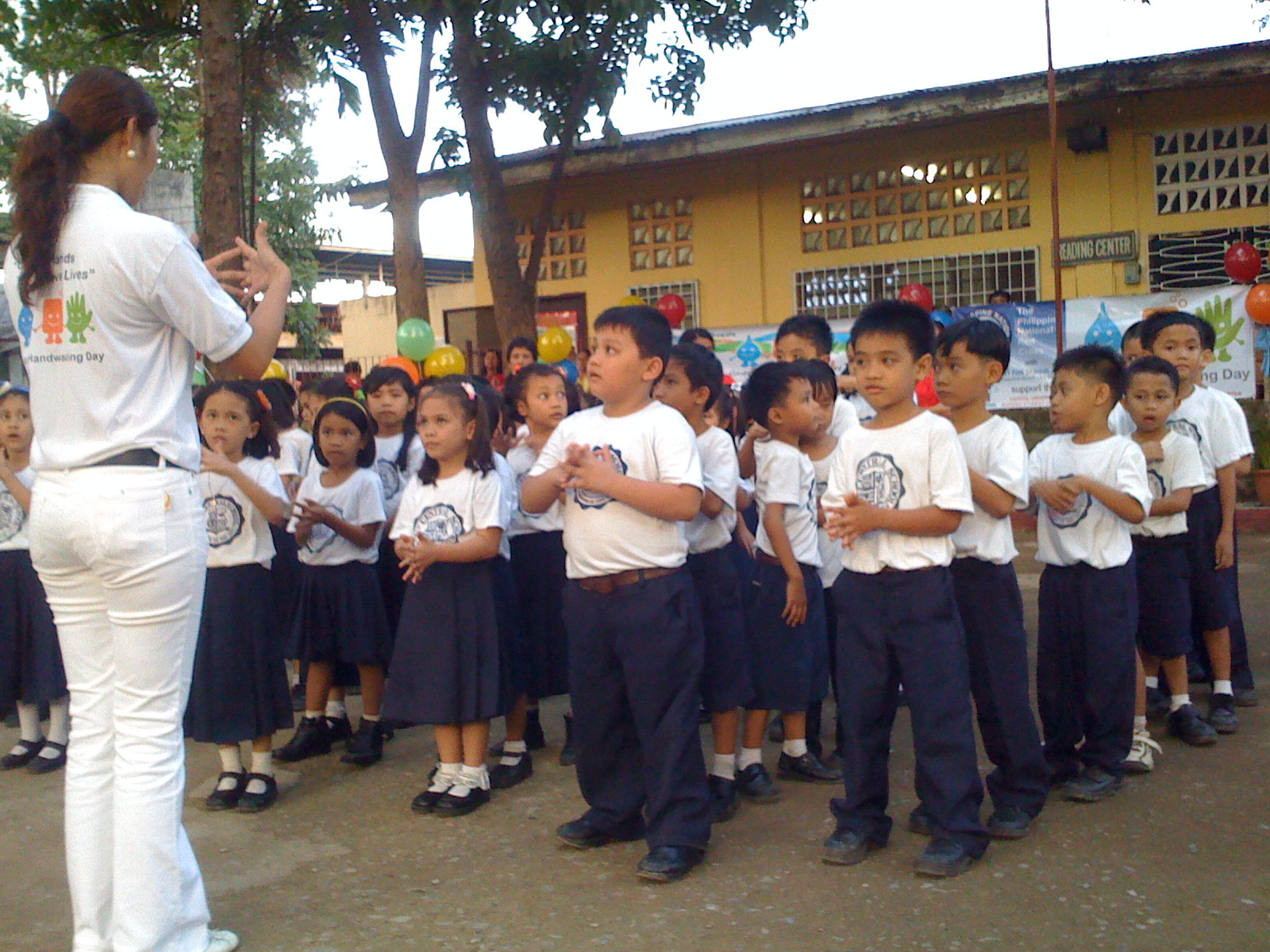
Dry run with kids at City Central School in Cagayan de Oro on how to wash hands with soap during Global Handwashing Day 2008 (Philippines)

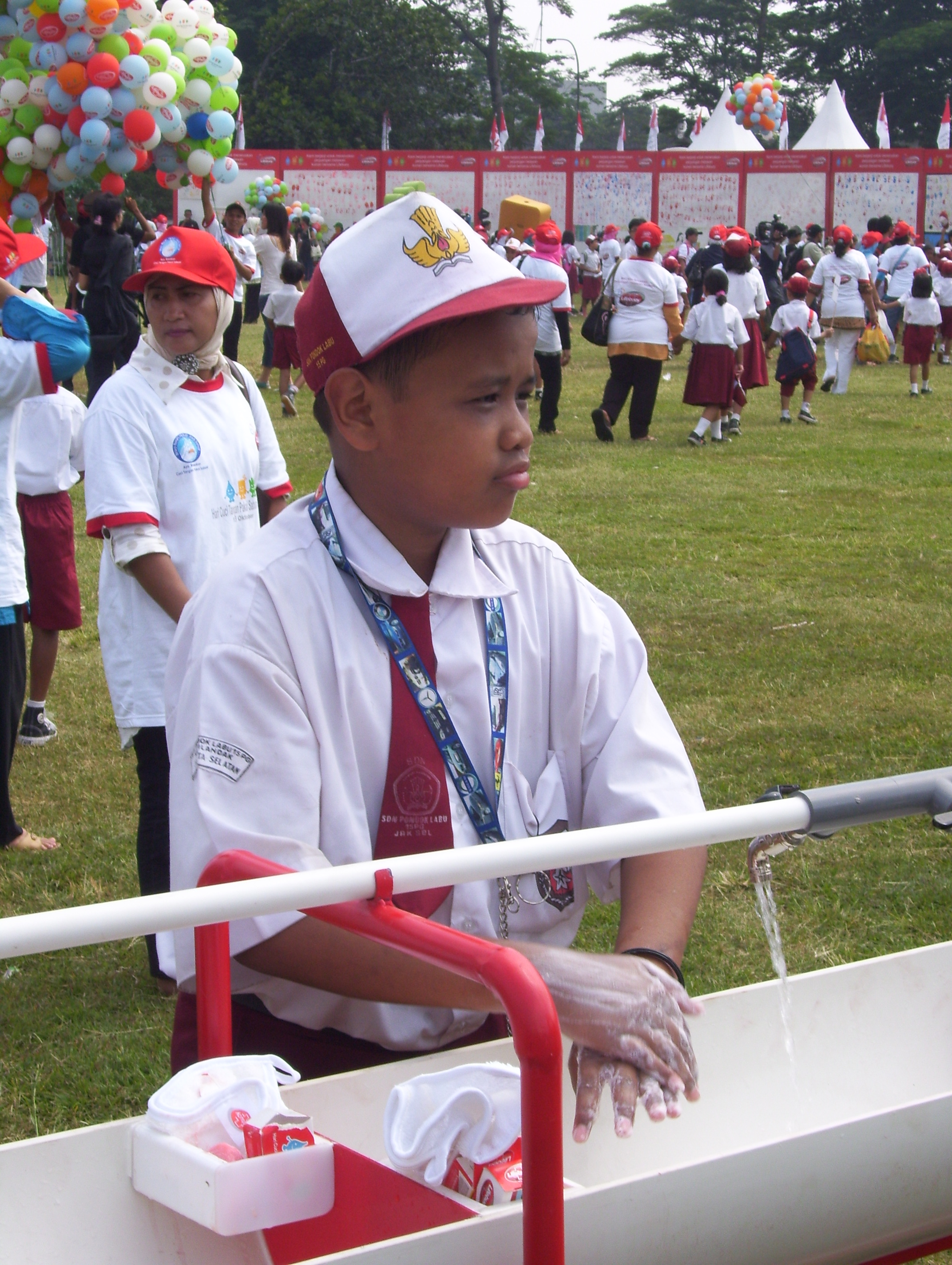
Global handwashing day celebrations in Indonesia in 2008

The campaign was initiated to reduce childhood mortality rates and related respiratory and Diarrhoeal diseases by introducing simple behavioral changes, such as handwashing with soap. This simple action can reduce the mortality rate of respiratory disease by 25%. Death from Diarrhoeal diseases can be reduced by 50%. Across the world, more than 60 percent of health workers do not adhere to proper hand hygiene. According to the US Centers for Disease Control and Prevention, US health care providers, on average, wash their hands less than half of the time they should. According to a 2023 survey reported by the US Centers for Disease Control and Prevention, approximately one in 38 hospital patients had at least one healthcare-associated infection on any given day.

=== Importance of handwashing ===
Handwashing with soap is recognized as a highly effective and cost-efficient method for preventing diseases such as diarrhea and acute respiratory infections. Pneumonia, a significant acute respiratory infection, is the leading cause of death among children under five years old, responsible for approximately 1.8 million child deaths each year. Together, diarrhea and pneumonia account for almost 3.5 million child fatalities annually. Studies estimate that handwashing with soap can reduce the incidence of diarrhea by 30% and respiratory infections by 21% in children under five years old.

Regular handwashing with soap is a critical practice for health and hygiene, significantly reducing the risks of certain diseases. It is more effective in preventing illness than some medical interventions, reducing diarrhea-related deaths by nearly half and deaths from acute respiratory infections by a quarter. Handwashing is frequently integrated into broader WASH (Water, Sanitation, and Hygiene) programs.

The Global Handwashing Day plays a key role in promoting awareness of handwashing benefits, particularly emphasizing its importance for children through engaging activities. Overall, effective hygiene practices hinge on awareness and the development of consistent handwashing habits.

Peer influence has been observed to play a significant role in encouraging handwashing practices. For instance, a study in Kenya demonstrated that the presence of peers increased the likelihood of students washing their hands. This effect of peer influence, however, depends on the awareness and acceptance among peers that handwashing is a positive and desirable behavior.

=== Related awareness days ===
The World Health Organization (WHO) celebrates a World Hand Hygiene Day on 5 May. The awareness day was initiated by the WHO in 2009. In 2018 the theme was prevention of sepsis in health care. The theme of the year before was to combat antibiotic resistance (AMR).

== Global collaboration ==
- The US Peace Corps volunteers have contributed to observation of Global Handwashing Day.
- Global Handwashing Day supports the 2013 Water for the World Act, which aims to improve effectiveness and efficiency of that part of U.S. foreign aid which is committed to global water, sanitation, and hygiene (WASH) by ensuring that funds will reach the neediest human populations who require WASH interventions the most.

== Campaign effectiveness ==
A 2012 study from China attempted to qualitatively assess Chinese social media users' reactions to Global Handwashing Day (GHD) 2012, in particular, and to health promotion campaigns in general. They concluded that social media data in China can be used to evaluate public health campaigns in China.

== See also ==
- Behaviour change (public health)
- Biological hazard
- Contagious disease
- Hygiene
- Infection control
- Infectious disease
- Menstrual Hygiene Day
- Sanitation
- Sustainable Sanitation Alliance
- World Toilet Day
