= Menstrual hygiene management =

Access to menstrual hygiene products and disposal of used products

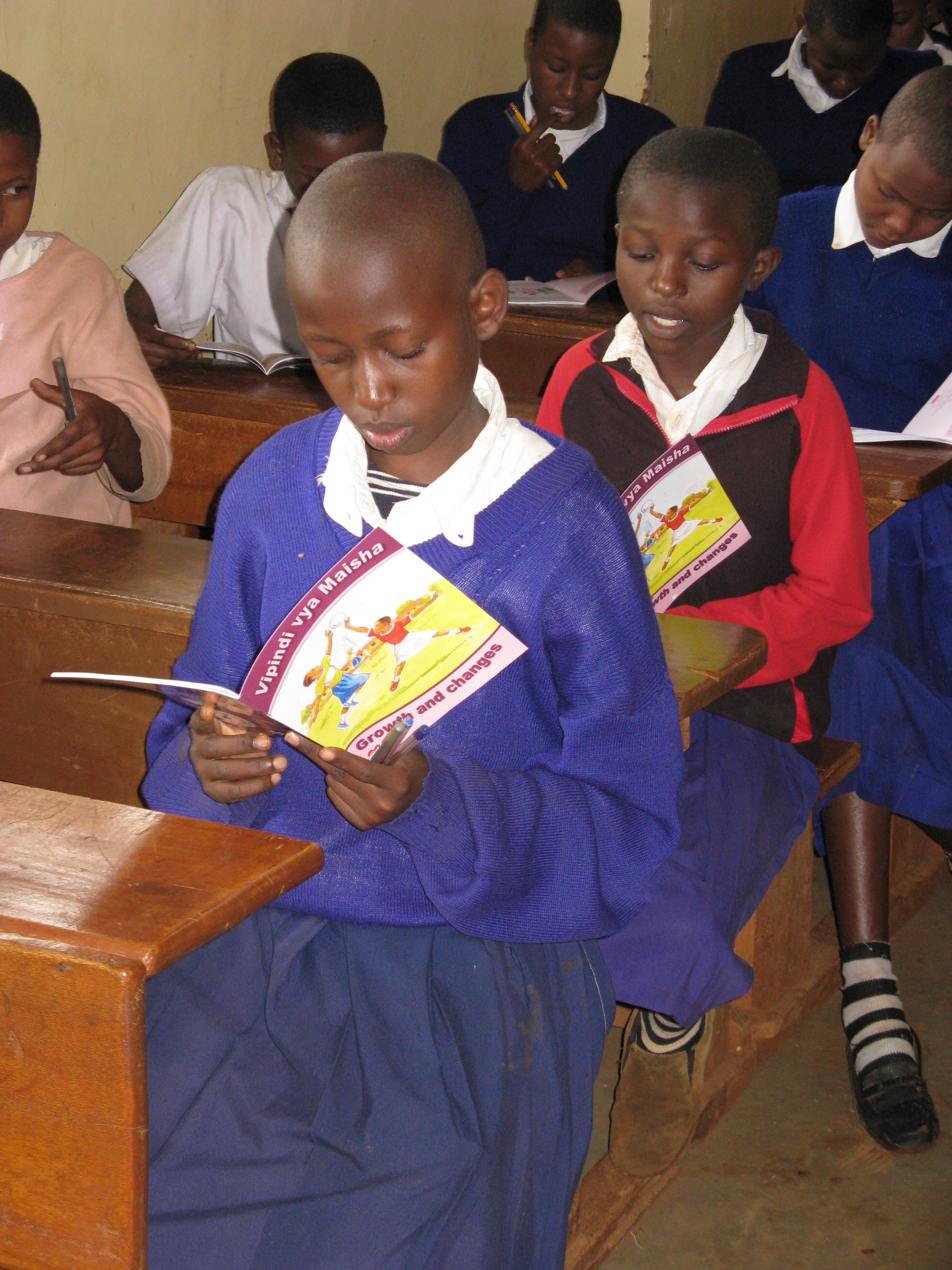
Tanzanian students learning about menstruation and puberty

Menstrual hygiene management (MHM) or menstrual health and hygiene (MHH) is the access to menstrual hygiene products to absorb or collect the flow of blood during menstruation, privacy to change the materials, and access to facilities to dispose of used menstrual management materials. It can also include the "broader systemic factors that link menstruation with health, well-being, gender equality, education, equity, empowerment, and rights". Menstrual hygiene management can be particularly challenging for girls and women in developing countries, where clean water and toilet facilities are often inadequate. Menstrual waste is largely ignored in schools in developing countries, despite it being a significant problem. Menstruation can be a barrier to education for many girls, as a lack of effective sanitary products restricts girls' involvement in educational and social activities.

== Terminology ==
An accepted definition of menstrual hygiene management (MHM) is:

- "Women and adolescent girls use a clean material to absorb or collect menstrual blood, and this material can be changed in privacy as often as necessary for the duration of menstruation.
- MHM also includes using soap and water for washing the body as required; and having access to facilities to dispose of used menstrual management materials."

The "value chain" related to menstrual hygiene management includes four aspects: awareness, access, use as well as waste management. The CLTS Knowledge Hub gives a definition that accounts for these four aspects as well as social and cultural factors:

Menstrual hygiene management' is the way in which women and adolescent girls deal with their menstruation. (Good) MHM requires a minimum level of knowledge and awareness in women and adolescent girls to manage their menstruation effectively and hygienically by using a clean material to absorb or collect menstrual blood, by practicing good hygiene and personal care during their period, and by having access to facilities to wash or dispose of used menstrual management materials with dignity and in an environmentally responsible manner. MHM is not just about the management of the menstrual period but also the need to address societal beliefs and taboos surrounding the issue. Sufficient knowledge, guidance and support for girls and women in preparation for and during menstruation is also part of the definition.

The term "menstrual health" is broader than menstrual hygiene. It encompasses both the menstrual hygiene management practices and the broader systemic factors that link menstruation with health, well-being, gender, education, equity, empowerment, and human rights (in particular the human right to water and sanitation). UNICEF now (since 2019) uses the term MHH for "menstrual health and hygiene".

These systematic factors include accurate and timely knowledge, available, safe, and affordable materials, informed and comfortable professionals, referral and access to health services, sanitation and washing facilities, positive social norms, safe and hygienic disposal, and advocacy and policy.

== History ==
The oldest known records of menstrual hygiene products date to ancient Egypt, where people utilized softened papyrus as a means of absorbing menstrual blood. In resource-constrained Indigenous communities, organic materials were likely employed for this purpose. There is speculation that Vikings used bog moss.

In the late 19th century, some suggest that menstruation was considered a form of illness. Doctor Edward Clark believed that attending school during menstruation could potentially delay the development of reproductive organs.

In 1897, Johnson & Johnson added sanitary napkins to its price list following a suggestion from Joseph Brown Cook. Despite limited acceptance of this product, it was the first commercially available sanitary protection product for women in the United States. These sanitary napkins were advertised minimally and in small print to maintain a sense of 'modesty'.

Sfag-Na-Kins, developed by the Sphagnum Moss Products Company, transformed sphagnum moss into sanitary napkins with the ability to absorb over 20 times their dry weight in fluids. In 1920, Johnson & Johnson introduced the discreetly named and plainly packaged Nupak brand, allowing women to make purchases inconspicuously.

The success of Kotex napkins in 1921 can be attributed to extensive advertising in women's magazines and the use of cellucotton enclosed within a gauze sheath. In 1928, Johnson & Johnson introduced silent purchase coupons in magazine ads for MODESS sanitary napkins, providing women with a discreet means of acquiring products without engaging with salespeople.

E.C. Haas filed a patent in 1931 for the Tampax tampons, featuring a paper-tube applicator. Tampons had initially been used in medical practice to control bleeding in deep wounds.

In 1957, Mary Davidson Kenner presented a patent for an adjustable sanitary belt designed to secure the pad, prevent menstrual blood leakage, and avoid stains. However, Kenner, a black woman, faced systemic barriers.

The popularity of belted sanitary napkins waned in the early 1980s with the advent of adhesive strips positioned on the bottom of sanitary pads, facilitating attachment to underwear linings. Since then, menstrual products have undergone substantial transformations, evolving to be more ergonomic, thinner, and incorporating diverse materials to enhance absorption.

=== Menstrual cups ===
Menstrual cups were commercially marketed in the United States by the late 1920s. The Hy-Kup, introduced around 1928, was a reusable rubber cup sold for $2. Advertisements presented menstrual cups as convenient, discreet and economical alternatives to disposable sanitary napkins. In 1937, Leona Chalmers patented a rubber menstrual cup marketed as the Tassette. Production was interrupted by rubber shortages during World War II, and attempts to relaunch the product in the 1950s were commercially unsuccessful. In 1969, the company introduced Tassaway, a disposable menstrual cup, but the business had ceased operating by the mid-1970s.

Reusable menstrual cups regained attention during the 1980s amid concerns about the safety, cost and environmental effects of disposable menstrual products. Around 1987, Lou Crawford began producing The Keeper, a latex rubber cup marketed through mail order and later online. Silicone menstrual cups entered the market in the early 2000s, including the UK-produced Mooncup in 2002 and Canada's Diva Cup in 2003. The Smithsonian Institution identifies environmental concerns, menstrual health activism and online information-sharing as factors contributing to their growing popularity.

== Challenges ==
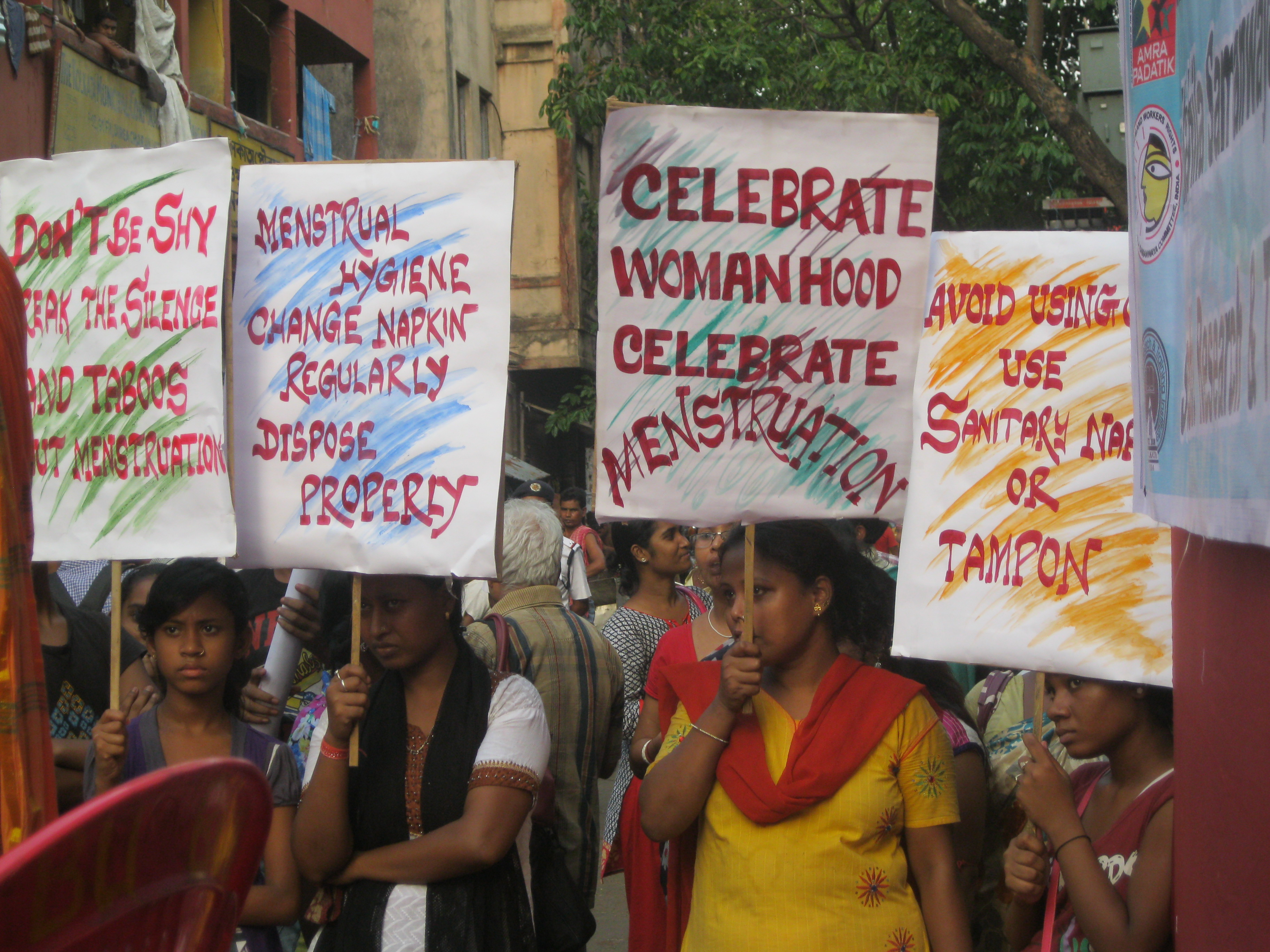
Celebration of Menstrual Hygiene Day in Amra Padatik, India.

Menstrual hygiene management can be particularly challenging for girls and women in developing countries, where clean water and toilet facilities are often inadequate. In addition, traditional cultures make it difficult to discuss menstruation openly. This limits women's and adolescent girls' access to relevant and important information about the normal functions of their own body. This directly affects their health, education, and dignity. Access to information can be considered a human right.

Currently, there are about 3.73 billion women in the world. According to the World Health Organization (WHO), 52%, or 1.9 billion, of those women are of reproductive age, thus menstruating. Women at some point in their life will go through the reproductive age and thus, will experience menstruation. It has been estimated that daily 300 million women are menstruating; on average a woman will spend about 3,500 days during her life menstruating.

Many adolescent girls and women of menstruating age live in poor socio-economic environments. 663 million people lack basic access to safe water, and 2.4 billion people lack adequate access to basic sanitary conditions. For women and girls, the lack of safe, accessible water, sanitation and hygiene (WASH) is particularly troubling during menstruation and childbirth. It has been estimated that half a billion (or 13%) of women lacked a place to defecate, have little to no privacy for menstrual hygiene management, and 3/4 of those lacked access to soap and water.

In a 2014 study conducted in India, the researchers found that as many as 42% of women who participated in the study did not know about sanitary pads or from where in their anatomy menstruation originated, and that "most of them were scared or worried on first menstruation." More recently, studies have shown that 50% of women in India have experienced a urinary tract infection (UTI) related to the inability to safely manage their period. When left untreated, UTIs can lead to kidney failure. Worldwide, in 2018, one in three women did not have access to a working toilet at all. Menstrual hygiene management issues have been ignored by professionals in the WASH sector, as well as in the health and education sectors.

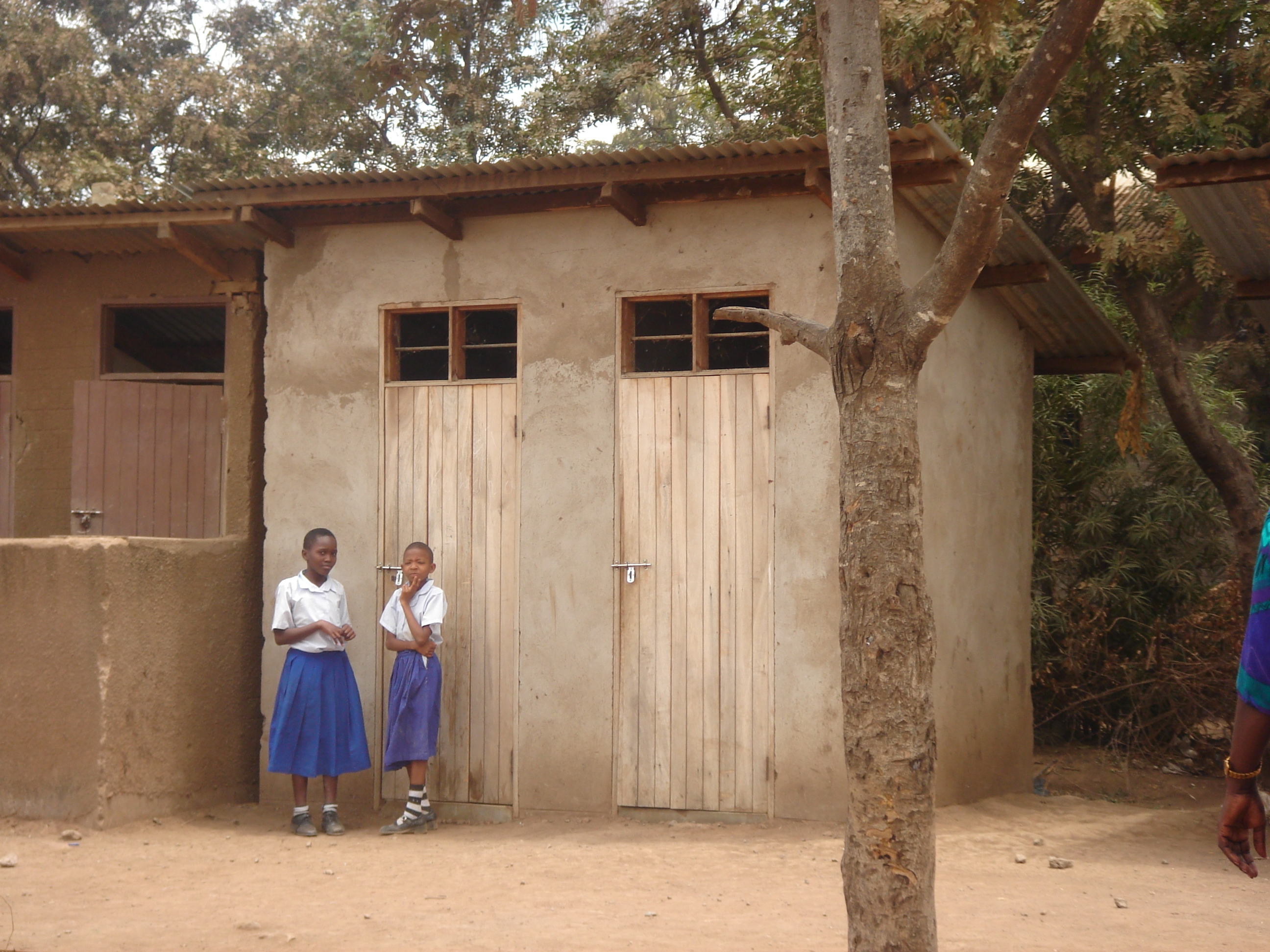
School toilets for girls in Tanzania, if they exist, often have no facilities to dispose of pads.

=== Health and psycho-social aspects ===
Poor MHM may affect the reproductive tract, but the specific infections, the strength of effect, and the route of transmission remain unclear. In India, a majority of girls are at risk for reproductive tract infections (RTI) because of poor MHM. RTI can lead to various disabilities if not treated early on and are the cause of 30–50% of prenatal infection. Due to prejudices surrounding the issue, some women in India do not eat or take showers during their menstruation.

Girls' self-image may be negatively impacted by adverse attitudes towards menstruation.

=== Sanitation facilities at schools ===
The onset of menstruation is challenging for school-aged girls in low-income settings. Impacts can include school absenteeism, missed class time, reduced participation, teasing, fear and shame, and risky adaptive behaviors. Further challenges that menstruating school girls face are a lack of knowledge, communication, and practical guidance prior to menarche and during menstruation; inadequate water, sanitation, and hygiene (WASH) facilities; and ineffective or unavailable menstrual management materials.

In many parts of sub-Saharan Africa, girls can miss up to 5 days of school a month or drop out entirely due to insufficient access to water, sanitation and hygiene (WASH) facilities and menstrual hygiene products. Improving access to WASH facilities can actually increase girls' attendance at school. A program for school sanitation in Bangladesh increased girls' enrollment at school by 11%.

Menstrual waste is largely ignored in schools in developing countries, despite it being a significant problem. Girls' access to water and sanitation at school is only available at 47% and 46% of all schools globally. Often, school toilets for girls (if they even exist) are missing bins for menstrual waste collection with the result that pads may be spread all around the school compound area. This pollutes the environment and also causes embarrassment for the school girls.

In the United States, among other countries, girls who are unable to afford feminine hygiene products may miss school in order "to avoid the embarrassment of staining their clothes". According to a study done by INTIMINA surveying students across Ohio State University, University of Wisconsin at Madison, Harvard University, New York University, and University of Central Florida, 19% of female college students said they have felt forced to decide whether to buy period products or other necessities like food.

=== Period poverty ===
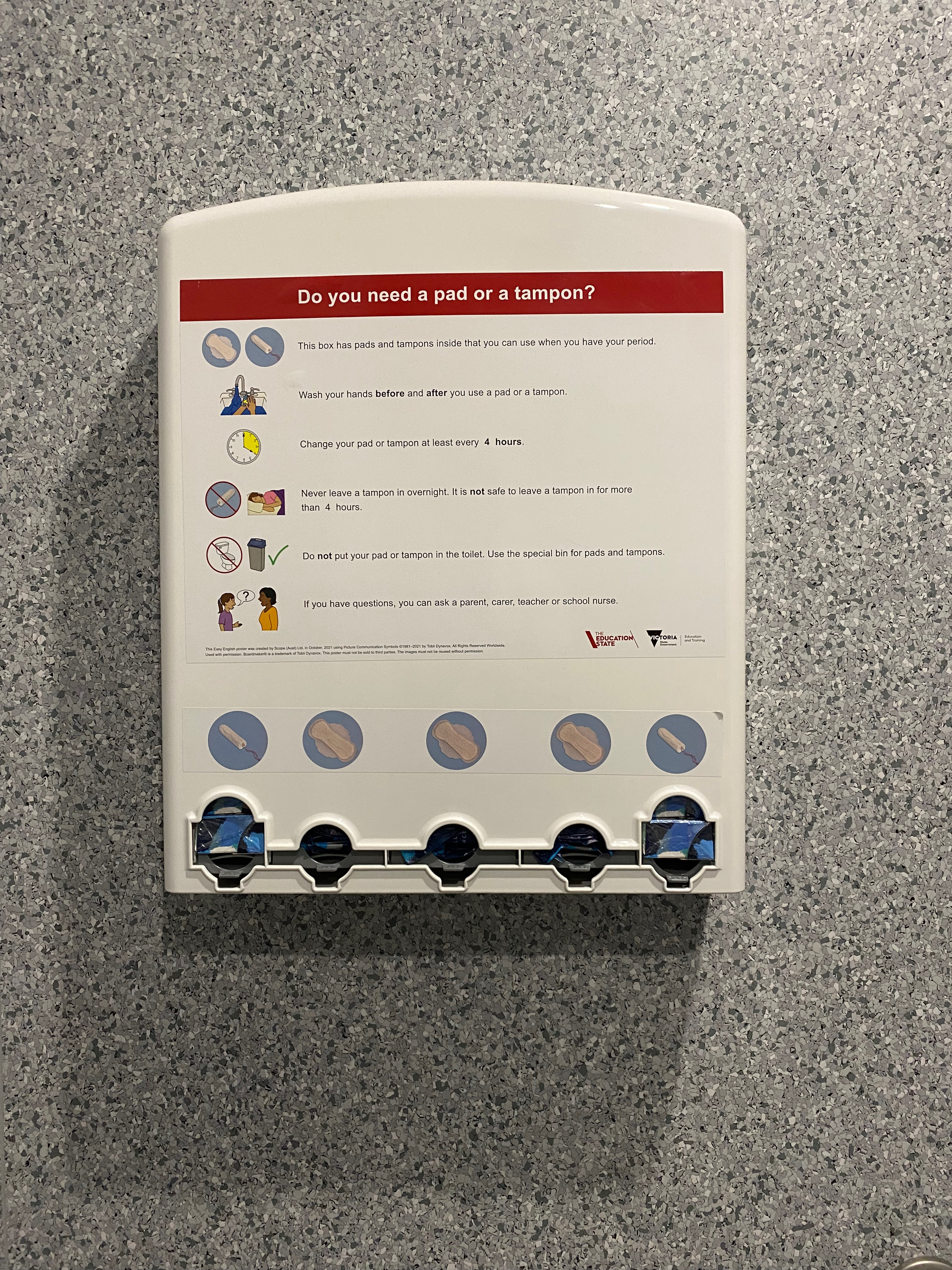
A period product dispenser in a bathroom in a public school in Victoria

Period poverty is a term used to describe the lack of access to adequate menstrual hygiene management supplies and education, including sanitary products (e.g., tampons, pads, liners, menstrual cups), washing facilities, and disposal management. It also includes other constraints such as taboos and myths, movement and food restrictions, shame and stigma around impurity and dirt which all contribute to the menstruator having an experience which is not dignified. Period poverty is a global health issue that affects many individuals living in low- and middle-income countries, with many young adolescents using materials such as mud, leaves, old paper, cotton, or animal skin to manage their periods. The use of alternative products, or using products longer than intended, can lead to health complications, infections, and long-term health issues. "In a 2018 study commissioned by U by Kotex, one in four women surveyed struggled to purchase period products. In the same study, one in five low-wage women reported missing work, school or similar events due to lack of access to period supplies. These instances were linked to reported feelings of embarrassment, disappointment and depression."

Despite known health consequences, period poverty is often overlooked and not discussed due to social and cultural stigmas and taboos. In recent years, many governments have actively increased access to affordable sanitary products and changing social norms towards menstruation. Scotland offers its residents free period products, while Kenya and New Zealand offer free period products for students in public schools. In Australia, the state of Victoria and the Australian Capital Territory are rolling out access to free period products in public places, and period products have been freely available in Victorian government-run schools since 2020. Many organizations are spreading awareness to policy makers about the problem of girls missing school due to period poverty.

However, period poverty remains a prevalent issue in the United States. In the United States, federal aid programs, including food stamps, SNAP benefits, and WIC benefits, do not cover purchases of feminine hygiene products. With the lack of government support and high taxes on menstrual products, many women choose forgo purchase of sanitary products for other needs. For instance, two-thirds of 16.9 million low-income women cannot afford sanitary products and have to choose between sanitary products and food. Currently, there are 14 states that ensure students have access to menstrual products in school bathrooms. School closures during the early onset of the COVID-19 pandemic challenged low-income students' access to pads and tampons.

The homeless population also has difficulty accessing menstrual products. In a mixed-method study of homeless individuals conducted from May to August 2019 in New York City, many participants reported that they had uncertain access to safe, clean, and private spaces for changing period products. Many reported that the bathrooms in their homeless shelters were dirty or flooded. They also reported feeling ashamed and embarrassed in public with the possibility of menstrual leakage. While most of the research on period poverty in the United States has largely focused on the homeless population and low-income school students, college students also report high rates, affecting school attendance and mental health, respectively. In 2021, approximately 14.2% of menstruating college students reported experiencing period poverty.

=== Access to materials ===
In low-income countries, girls' choices of menstrual hygiene materials are often limited by cost, availability, and social norms.

Absorption materials that may be used by women who cannot afford commercially produced materials include: sand, ash, small hole in earth, cloth, whole leaf, leaf fiber (such as water hyacinth, banana, papyrus, cotton fibre), paper (toilet paper, re-used newspaper, brown paper bags, pulped and dried paper), animal pelt (such as goat skin), double layer of underwear, socks, skirt, or sari.

A lack of affordable hygiene products can present health risks. Menstrual cups can offer a longer-term solution compared to some other (disposable) feminine hygiene products because they do not need to be replaced monthly, although they require access to clean water for washing them. A menstrual disc is a reusable, medical-grade silicone product designed to collect menstrual fluid for up to 12 hours. It sits higher in the vaginal canal than a tampon, which can improve comfort and discretion. These products are safe for IUD users, cost-effective, and sustainable for over five years, they deliver a modern, eco-conscious solution for period care.

Girls and women in the workplace often miss work because they don't have access to sanitary materials and places of employment in some countries do not provide resources for women or even have "proper toilets". Women in Bangladesh who work in factories have reported that due to the cost of sanitary products for menstruation which they could not afford, they have resorted to using "factory-floor rags in place of pads and tampons, leading to dangerous infections and missed work." The Christian sweeper community in Lahore who clean the roads do not have access to public washrooms because none or very few are available for women and because of this have to miss work when they have their period.

Menstruation can be a barrier to education for many girls, as a lack of effective sanitary products restricts girls' involvement in educational and social activities. Often they do not attend school due to fear of leaking, shame or embarrassment, period pain or inadequate sanitation facilities that do not allow them to wash or change in privacy. This applies mainly to schoolgirls from low-income families, since disposable hygiene products are a monthly expense that many people simply cannot afford.

Adequate sanitation facilities and access to menstrual hygiene products are just one part of the solution to menstrual taboos that impede women's progress in many developing countries. Knowledge is critical for girls to feel comfortable with menstruation and to gain a positive awareness of their bodies.

Access to menstrual hygiene products may be limited in prisons and correctional facilities where the services have been historically designed for the male population. In 2021 there were around 740,000 women in prisons around the world A woman incarcerated for five years in Pakistan spoke of how the prison authorities did not provide any menstrual products or pain relief medication to menstruating women.

==== US and UK ====
Many low-income and/or homeless girls and women in the inner cities of the United States cannot afford sanitary supplies. Food banks in New York report that feminine hygiene products are in high demand. Homeless women in the United States may face the challenge of not being able to shower or use the communal toilet in homeless shelters as often as they need to in cases where there are restrictions on toilet usage. In New York, proposals to help lower-income women access menstrual sanitary supplies include proposals to remove the sales tax on feminine hygiene products and "distributing free tampons in public schools." Sales tax are levied on menstrual supplies in 36 states. On May 1, 2018, the National Diaper Bank Network, which provides millions of diapers to poor and low income parents and advocates for policy change around basic needs, launched the Alliance for Period Supplies and began distributing free period products through allied organizations across the U.S. Homeless women in other industrialized countries, such as the United Kingdom, face problems affording tampons and sanitary napkins. Scotland became the first country in the world to provide universal access to free period products in 2020. Research has shown that for allotment holders who menstruate, lack of access to sanitation at their plots can lead to challenges in hygiene.

==== South Asia ====
Homeless women in Pakistan use dried ash wrapped in cloth to help them during their period. They have no access to clean running water, public washrooms are few and mainly for men, there is no privacy, no place to rest, and the women suffer from many infections.

=== Disposal of used materials ===
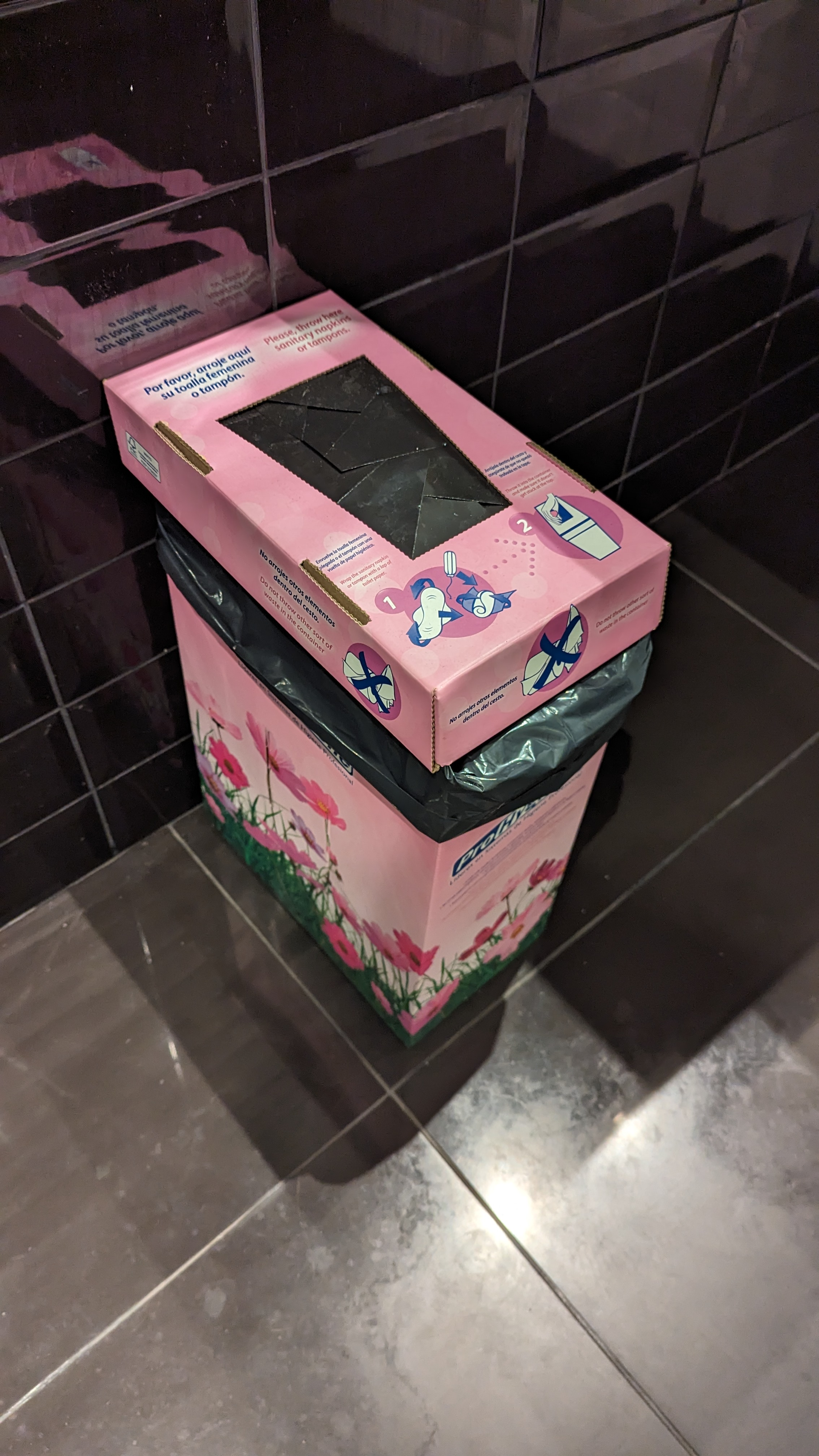
Recyclable sanitary care box in Montevideo.

A review in 2018 found that disposal of menstrual waste is often neglected in sanitation systems. This leads to improper disposal and negative impacts on users, the sanitation systems and the environment.

Solid waste disposal systems in developing countries are often lacking, which means women have no proper place to dispose of used products, such as pads. Inappropriate disposal of used materials also creates pressures on sanitation systems as menstrual hygiene products can create blockages of toilets, pipes and sewers.

It is estimated that tampons, pads, and applicators, generates 200,000 tonnes of plastic waste in the UK each year.

In developing countries, women experience a lack of access to affordable menstrual hygiene products in addition to a lack of access to other services such as sanitation and waste disposal systems needed to manage their menstrual cycles. Lack of access to waste disposal leads women to throw used products in toilet systems, pit latrines, or discard them into open areas such as bodies of water. These practices pose dangers to workers who handle these wastes, as it increases possible exposure to bloodborne infections in soaked menstrual products and exposure to chemicals found in menstrual hygiene products. Inappropriate disposal also creates pressures on sanitation systems as menstrual hygiene products create sewage blockages. The effects of these inadequate facilities have been shown to have social effects on girls in developing countries, leading to school absenteeism.

=== Taboos ===
Despite the fact that menstruation is a healthy biological process, it is approached with hesitance and misinformation because of deeply-rooted cultural taboos surrounding menstruation.

Cultural, religious and traditional beliefs — particularly in developing countries — can lead to restrictions that women or girls face during their period. In some societies, women do not wash their bodies, shower, or bathe during menstruation. They may not be allowed to use water sources during menstruation. Even if they have access to toilets, they might not use them because of the fear of staining the toilet bowls (in the case of dry toilets or flush toilets where the flush is not powerful). This impairs the use of menstrual cups compared to pads as the cups are normally emptied into toilets.

Expanding the discussion to include consideration of waste management is part of the attempt to "normalize" conversations about menstruation.

=== Sustainability ===
Sustainable menstruation refers to the use of environmentally-friendly and responsible menstrual products. It is estimated that the average woman will bleed for an average of 40 years which can amount to upwards of 200 kg of menstrual product waste a year. To combat this environmental challenge, advocates of sustainable menstruation promote the use of reusable products such as cloth menstrual pads, menstrual cups and period underwear, and also sustainably-produced biodegradable disposable products. Such practices reduce the waste created by disposable products (tampons and pads) made of non-biodegradable materials.

There is some concern that by focusing on menstruation as a focus in discussions in waste, it further stigmatizes menstruation by blaming women for problems they didn't create. In India, 6% of non-biodegradable waste is created by hygiene products including menstruation products, wipes and diapers.

== Approaches for improvements ==
MHM in schools should not be a stand-alone programme but should be integrated with existing programmes on WASH in schools, school health and nutrition programmes, puberty education programmes, and emergencies.

In rural Bolivia, a menstrual hygiene management game was developed for school girls that stimulated detailed responses, and diversified participatory activities in focus group discussions. The board game helped to ease girls' discomfort discussing menstruation.

In India, comic books Menstrupedia Comic have been used to educate children, street theatre performances to educate men and women, wall paintings and murals to engage community youth and art workshops and exhibitions to break the stigma and shame.

In Bhutan, the Buddhist nuns, through the Bhutan Nuns Foundation, have revolutionised the menstrual health of the nuns living in nunneries.

In Pakistan, many new start ups in this area have contributed to improving access and making the subject easier to talk about. In Balochistan, a tribal area of Pakistan, the first ever menstrual health participatory workshop, held in 2021, used poetry and art to raise awareness and change the discussion around the subject and make it more open.

Improving MHM requires community-wide attitudinal changes. Involving men in MHM is key in order to get them to support their wives and daughters. Other organisations have also worked with games and stories to teach MHM, dispel common myths and start conversations. Games help create a positive atmosphere around a topic generally associated with shame and embarrassment.

An under researched area is how people living with disabilities cope with the challenges of menstruation, and how their care givers have to manage their menstrual hygiene and health for them.

Further research investigation and practical assistance is also needed for those living in temporary shelters due to migration, climate change, flooding, earthquakes, communal riots or other such reasons of displacement.

In 2014, Wash United initiated Menstrual Hygiene Day on May 28. Menstrual Hygiene Day creates an occasion for publicizing information about menstrual hygiene management issues in the media as a way to raise awareness, celebrate and normalize menstruation and menstrual hygiene. The day offers an opportunity to actively advocate for the integration of menstrual hygiene management into global, national, and local policies and programmes.

== See also ==
- Public toilets
- Period underwear
- Sustainable Development Goal 6
- Tampon tax
- Period. End of Sentence.
- Water issues in developing countries
