= Southall's =

Southalls, formerly Southall Brothers & Barclay (1898) and T & W & W Southall (1820), was a British manufacturer located in Birmingham, England, specialising in goods made from cotton. Its products included sanitary towels and knickers, hospital pads, surgical dressings, and items associated with childbirth. The company operated several mills that processed raw cotton before producing the merchandise.
