= Menstrupedia Comic =

Health education guide

- A page from the comic book

Publication information
- Publisher: Menstrupedia.com
- Format: various
- Genre: Health
- Publication date: 2012 to date

Creative team
- Created by: Aditi Gupta, Tuhin Paul

Menstrupedia comic is a guide to educate people around the world, particularly in India, on menstruation. It was started by Aditi Gupta and her now husband, Tuhin Paul. Menstrupedia aims to help people understand the process of puberty in women and men in order to destroy myths around menstruation and normalise the biological process.

== Background ==
When Aditi Gupta attained puberty at the age of 12, she found that menstruation is a taboo topic in India. She had to follow Indian traditional customs that implied that a menstruating person was impure, and although her family was well-to-do and educated, she had no access to sanitary napkins because buying them was considered shameful. As she grew up and moved away from her hometown, her perception of menstruation changed. She wished to spread awareness to help girls understand their bodies better and not let society shame them for their biology.

The project started as a computer game, then a board game, developed when Gupta and Paul were students at the National Institute of Design in Gandhinagar; it was originally Gupta's thesis project. The project was launched in 2012 as a prototype pamphlet in Hindi before becoming printed comic books in 2013 following a crowdfunding campaign.

== Comic ==
Menstrupedia explains menstruation by using relatable characters. The book is designed in a culturally sensitive manner with no objectionable drawings. The content of the book is reviewed by gynecologists for medical accuracy. In the comic, Priya Didi, a doctor, explains puberty to her younger cousin Pinki and to Pinki's friends Jiya and Mira. When Jiya gets her first period during Pinki's birthday party, Priya Didi uses the opportunity to talk to the girls about menstrual health, hygiene and puberty as they ask her questions.

Menstrupedia comic is available in 17 languages and also co-published in 11 countries namely Kenya, UK, Malaysia, Brazil, Egypt, Australia, Maldives, Uruguay, Nepal, Hungary, and Zimbabwe.

== Blog ==
The associated blog is a crowd-sourced platform with more than 3000 writers, some as young as 12, and intentionally beautiful illustrations "to flip the narrative". The website also contains Q&A and Learn sections. The online content and the comic have both been reviewed by medical professionals for accuracy.

== Popularity ==
Since its launch, Menstrupedia has received appreciation for its fact-based portrayal of menstruation. As of March 2019, the comic had been published into 17 languages, such as English, Hindi, Assamese, Bengali, Gujarati, Kannada, Malayalam, Marathi, Odia, Punjabi, Tamil, Telugu, Tibetan, Urdu, including Nepali, Hungarian, and Spanish, and has been incorporated by over 25,500 schools across India.

The initiative further gained recognition through its appearance on Shark Tank India, (the Indian adaptation of the American TV series Shark Tank) from the CEO of Emcure Pharmaceuticals and Shark Tank India judge Namita Thapar.

In 2016 the comic won the Laadli Media Award and Advertising for gender sensitivity, held at the National Centre for the Performing Arts.

In 2018, the comic was gifted to more than 525 girls from a school run by Nagar Prathmik Shikshan Samiti in Navsari to educate them about menstruation and hygiene.

In 2019 the comic was featured in Vogue Japan under the section celebrating the female power in Asia.

In 2020 the Assamese version of the comic was released for a function held at the conference hall of Deputy Commissioner's office in Dibrugarh as part of Project Sakhi with the aim to foster better menstrual hygiene management for girl students.

The same efforts were continued in 2021 on the occasion of International Menstrual Hygiene Day by Deputy Commissioner Mr Sandeep Hans who procured 4000 books under the 'Beti Bachao Beti Padhao' scheme which have been sent to government schools of Moga.

Later in 2022, an interactive session on menstruation was conducted by Open Eye Foundation for girl students in Govt Model Middle School in Chandigarh, followed by distribution of Menstrupedia comics.
