= Women's Environment Network =

Women's Environment Network (WEN), is a British organisation aimed at supporting women, which lobbies industry to address adverse effects on the environment and the health of women and children.
