= Diaper bank =

Charitable organization that gives out diapers

A diaper bank (British English: nappy bank) is a social institution or nonprofit organization formed for the sole purpose of providing diapers to people in poverty who do not have access to diapers. Federally funded public assistance programs do not pay for or contribute to the payment for diapers. Diaper banks accept donations and diapers to provide for either children or adults suffering from incontinence and distribute diapers to partner agencies for distribution to people in their social programs in need of diapers. In 2011, the National Diaper Bank Network was formed to help distribute diapers across the United States.

== History ==
An early diaper bank was founded in Pinellas County, Florida in the United States in August 1960. By the late 1990's, that diaper bank was no longer operating. Starting with their first diaper drive in 1994 and becoming an official nonprofit in 2000, the Diaper Bank of Southern Arizona became the first diaper bank to operate as a permanent community resource. It initially began as a donation to the local community by a local consulting company, ReSolve, Inc., under the leadership of Hildy Gottlieb and Dimitri Petropolis.

== See also ==
- Diaper need
