= Kuli-kuli =

Nigerian snack made from peanut

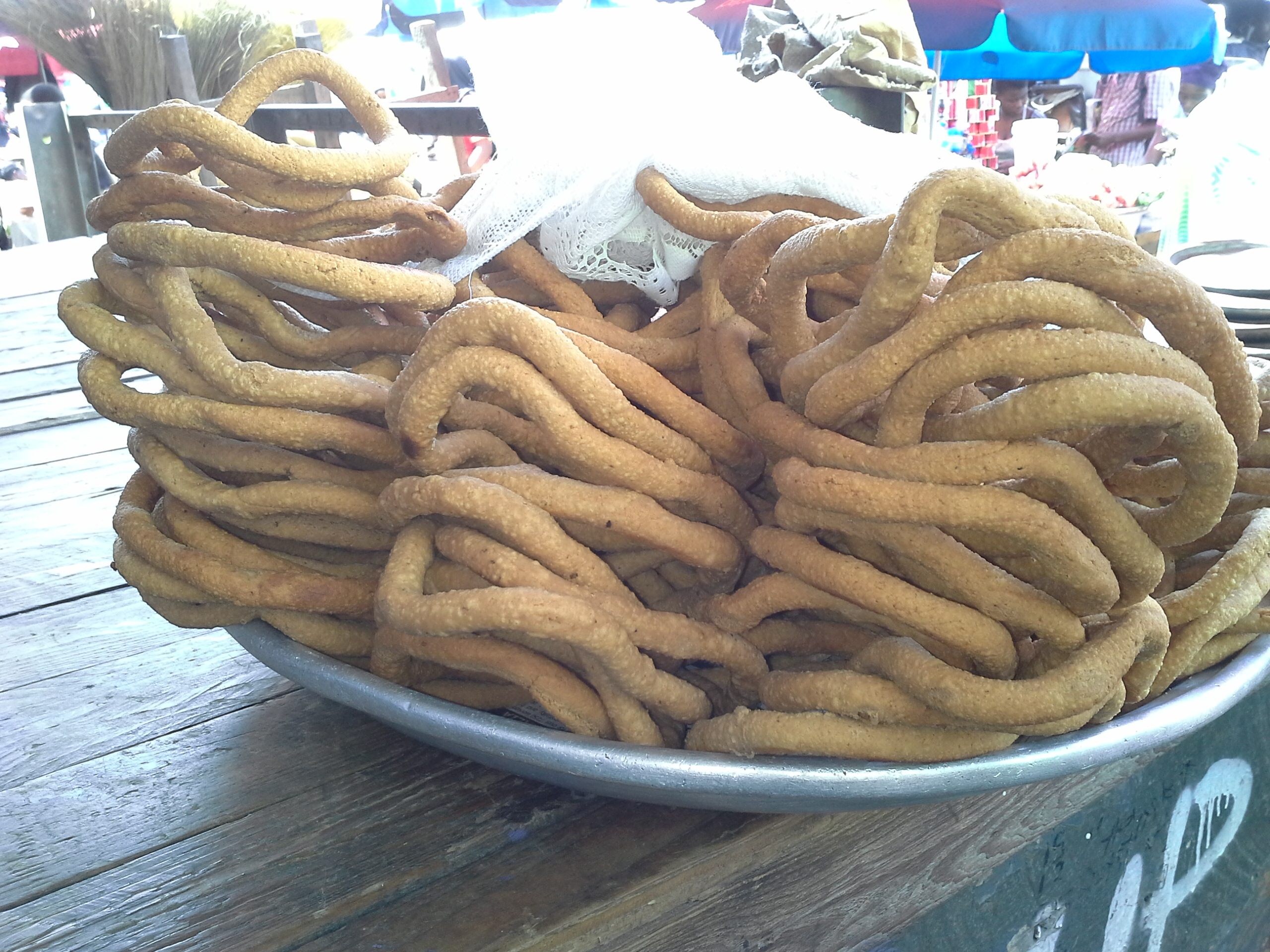
- Kuli-kuli of Ghana
- Alternative names: Kwirikwiri, kwili kwili or kurikuri
- Type: Snack
- Place of origin: Nigeria
- Region or state: North Central Nigeria
- Created by: Nupe
- Invented: 1920
- Serving temperature: Room temperature
- Main ingredients: Peanuts
- Ingredients generally used: Oil, salt, sometimes black pepper, spices

Kuli-kuli is a Nigerian snack primarily made from peanuts, first made by the Nupe people of Nigeria. It is a popular snack in Nigeria, Benin, northern Cameroon and Ghana. Today kuli-kuli is accepted across the globe. It is often eaten alone or with a mixture of garri also known as cassava flakes, sugar and water, popularly called "garri soakings". It is also eaten with Hausa koko, fura, and akamu, and is sometimes ground and put into salad. It is often ground and used as an ingredient for suya and kilishi.

Kuli-kuli is a byproduct of processing raw peanuts into peanut oil.

== Ghanaian kuli-kuli ==
Kuli-kuli is a common crispy snack in Ghana and many other parts of West Africa. The ingredients and shapes used are not universal. In the northern part of the country, especially among the Dagbon people, kuli-kuli is made from the residue from groundnuts during the extraction of groundnut oil. It is mostly found in the Zongo communities in Ghana.

== Preparation ==
To make kuli-kuli, peanuts are roasted and then ground into a paste called labu. The paste is then mixed with spices, salt, and sometimes ground pepper, and occasionally sugar. The paste is stripped of excess oil with water and made into the desired shape (round balls, cylinders, etc.). Adding potash to the oil increases the boiling point of the oil. This results in oils being extracted from the kuli-kuli so that more liquid oil is created than when the process started. While being heated and fried, the shaped peanut-paste begins to solidify and harden. It is then removed from the oil and allowed to cool down until ready to be eaten. It has a very long shelf life and is often given to children as a treat or sold in taxi parks to travellers.

All aspects of producing and selling the peanut oil and kuli-kuli are socially considered 'woman's work'. Quite often, women control all aspects of kuli-kuli production and sales. Women grow the crop, extract and refine the oil, cook the kuli-kuli, carry it to the market, and sell it. In many cultural groups, this is considered 'her (personal) money' generated to spend as she deems fit. In contrast, a man growing peanuts is more likely to sell his entire crop of 100 kilo bags wholesale. The wholesaler will be responsible for transportation.

=== Nutrition ===
Kuli-kuli contains proteins because of the peanuts from which it is made. It also contains magnesium, phosphorus and vitamin E.

== Gallery ==
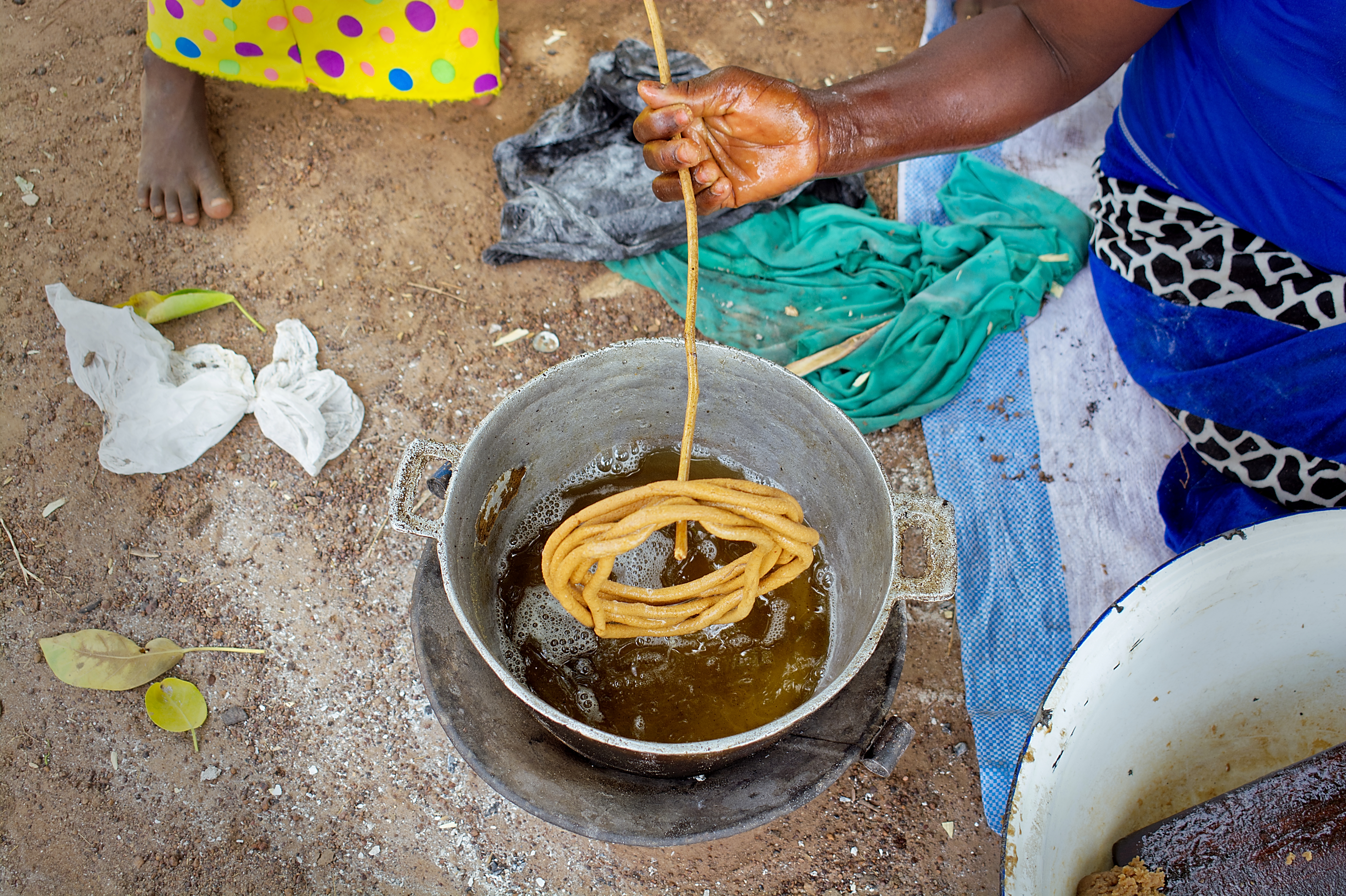
Making kuli-kuli in Ghana

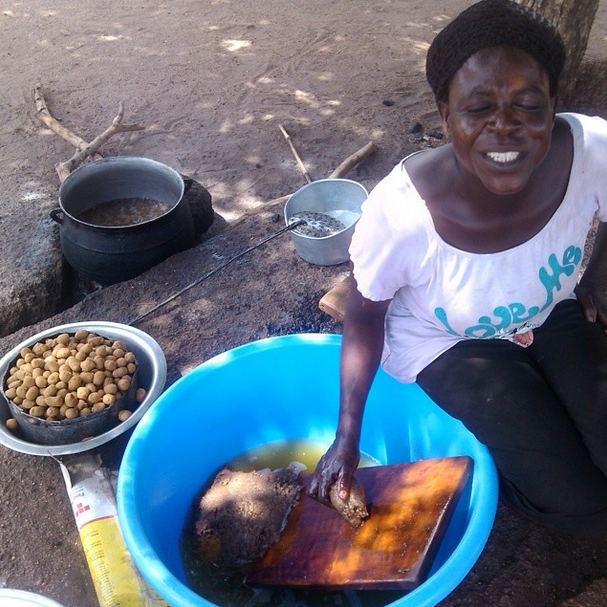
Kulu-kuli made in Bongo

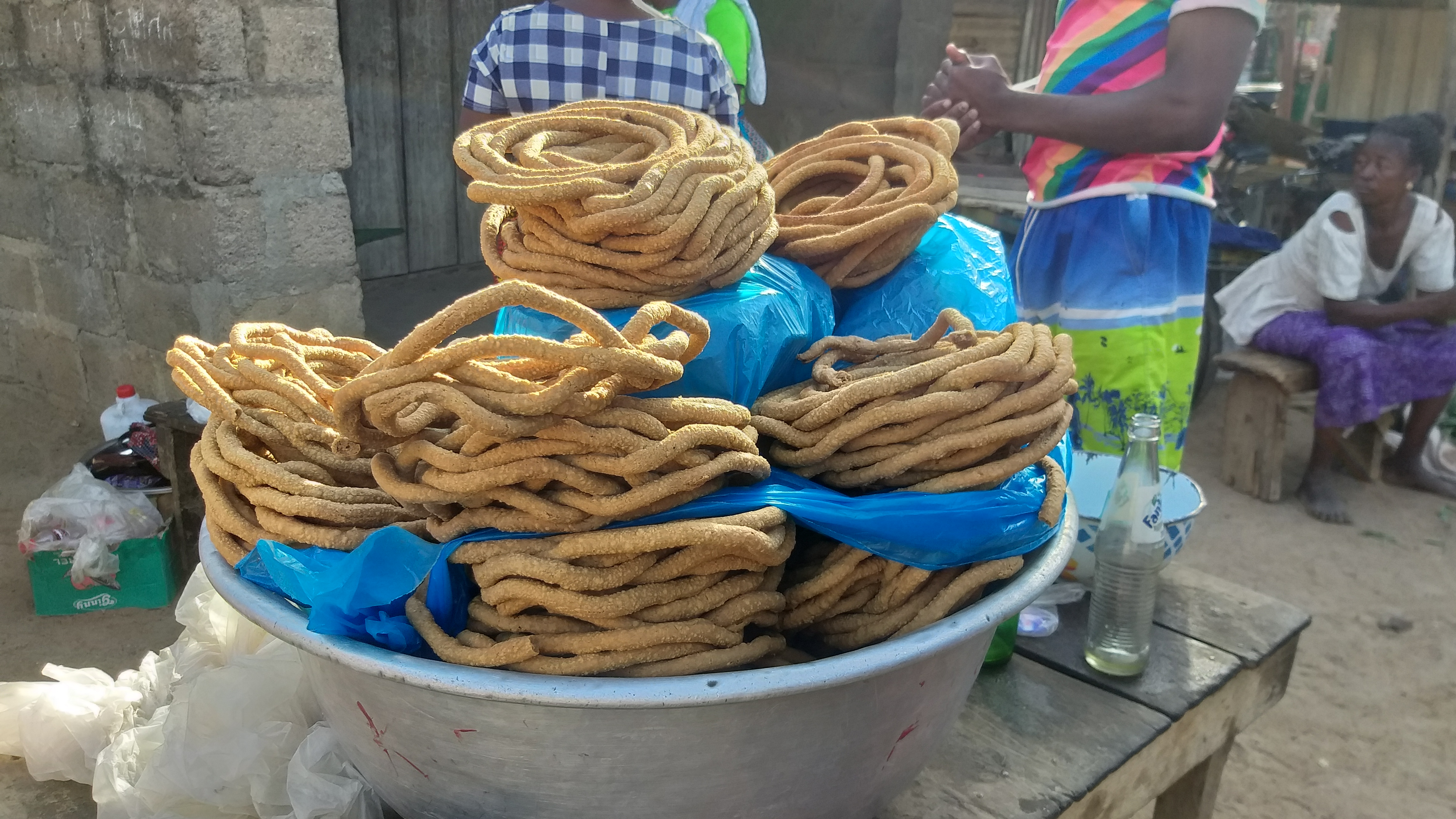
Kuli kuli, a local snack

== See also ==
- List of African dishes
- Hausa people
