= Veronica Bekoe =

Ghanaian biologist

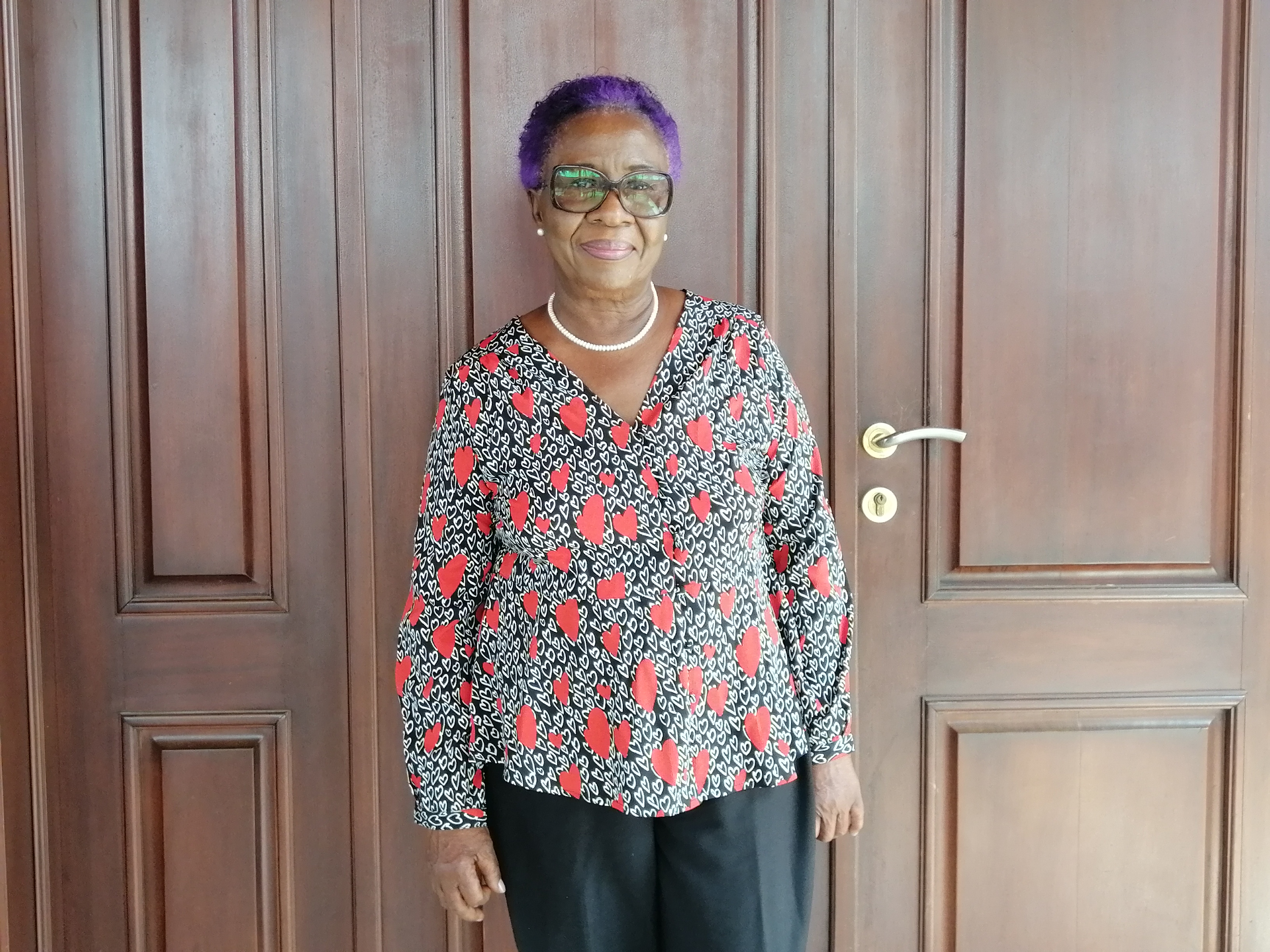
- Citizenship: Ghanaian
- Education: Kwame Nkrumah University of Science and Technology
- Occupation: Biologist
- Notable work: Veronica Bucket
- Veronica Bekoe Recorded June 2020

Veronica Ayele Bekoe is a biologist from Ghana. She is known for her impact in the invention of the Veronica bucket used to reduce the spread of communicable diseases.

== Education ==
Veronica started her basic education at the Government Girls School (currently Independence Avenue Basic School) in Accra. She attended Aburi Girls SHS for her secondary education. She later furthered her education at Kwame Nkrumah University of Science and Technology (KNUST) where she obtained Bachelor of Science in Biological Science/Biology between 1968 – 1972.

== Career ==
Her career in the Ghana Health Service (GHS) spanned from 1972-2008, working at the Public Health and Reference Laboratory, worked as a prime person for the National AIDS/STI Control Program and also has over 30 years' experience in medical laboratory practice. She has experience in laboratory management, development of training manuals, mentorship, development of guidelines for laboratory diagnostics among others.

== Achievement ==
Veronica is noted for her invention of the Veronica bucket, a device was invented to curb or reduce the spread of diseases like cholera through handwashing cross-contamination. In 2020, the bucket was widely used in the African continent and the global community to fight the novel pandemic coronavirus disease COVID-19. Her discovery and invention of the veronica bucket was as a result of a problem or gap she identified in her field of work, she noticed that there was a challenge with running water and they had to use a bowl of water in turns to wash their hands after medical work which was very dangerous to their health because everyone had to use the same water until it becomes dirty, seeing the health implications she created a prototype bucket with a tap attached to an aluminium utensils used in selling Hausa koko, popularly known as Akorlaa gyae su which has now become the veronica bucket recognized globally.

== Awards ==
- She was given an award by Mrs. Rebecca Akufo-Addo for her social innovation in combating infectious diseases using soap under running water.
- She received the covetous order of the Volta individual award for her innovation.
