= SolaWash =

Automated hand washing machine

Solar Wash
- Type: Mobile Washing Solar Machine
- Inventor: Richard Kwarteng & Team
- Available: Available

SolaWash is an automated and mobile hand washing machine powered by solar panels. It was invented by Richard Kwarteng and his team in Kumasi, Ghana. The Solar Wash machine was invited to fight against the novel coronavirus pandemic by not touching the tap before and after washing hands. Richard Kwarteng said he took inspiration from the veronica bucket when he and his team was inventing the solar wash.

== Mechanics ==
The solar wash machine is powered by a sensor which allows an individual to wash hands without touch the tap. When washing hands the soap comes out from the tap first for individual to wash hands thoroughly with liquid soap during which an alarm beeps for twenty-five seconds after which water comes out of the tap to rinse hands. The system can wash the hands of 150 individuals.

== Certification ==
The Technology was certified by the Ghana Standards Authority (GSA) in four days instead of the normal twenty-one days of certification. This was quickly commercialized to fight against COVID-19.

== Achievements ==
The team of inventors led by Richard Kwarteng were endorsed by The President of Ghana Nana Akuffu-Addo and other global bodies like United Nation (UN).
