= Veronica bucket =

Hand-washing apparatus to reduce cross-contamination

Veronica Bucket
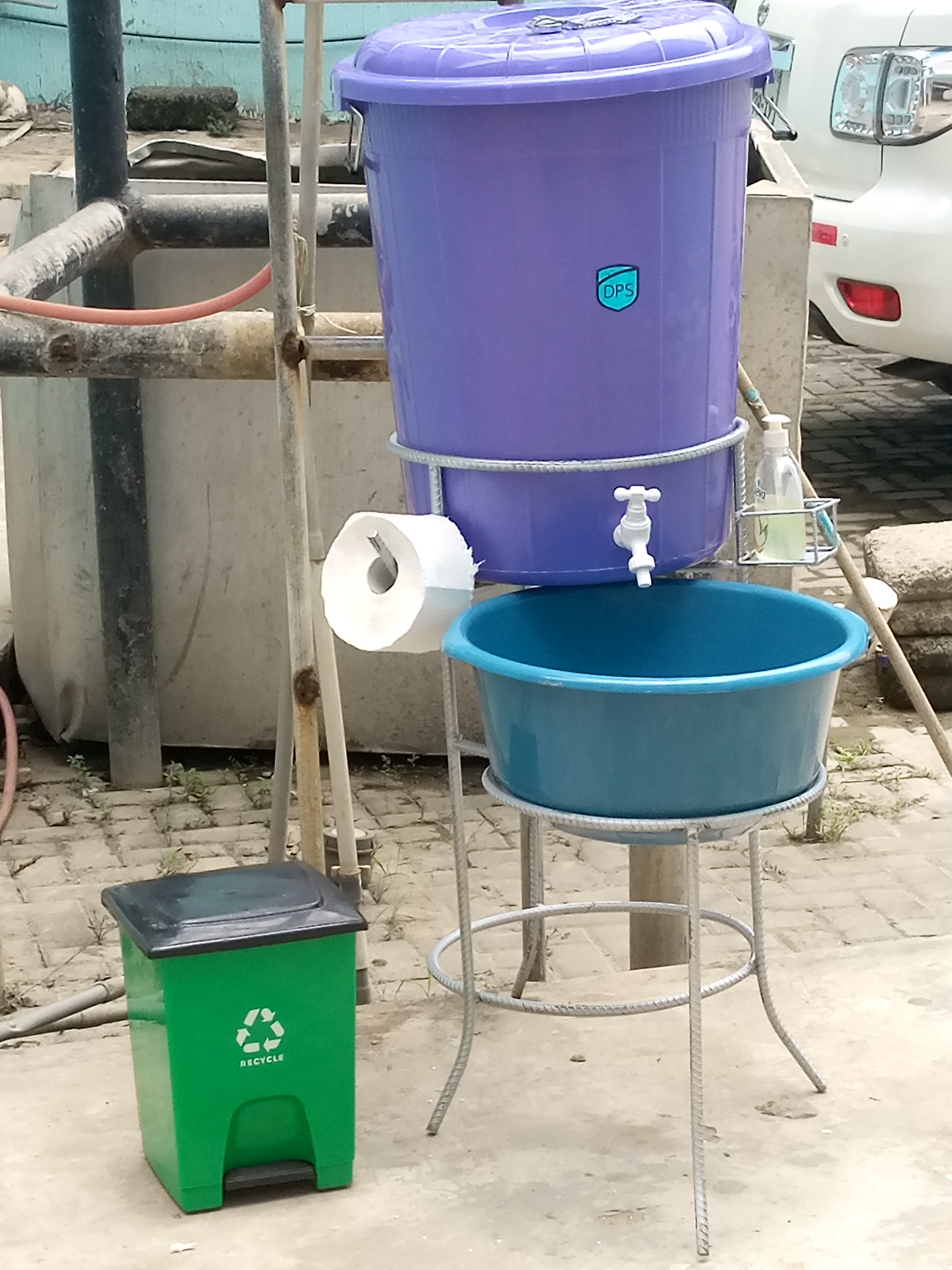
- Type: Bucket
- Inventor: Veronica Bekoe
- Available: Available Veronica Bucket Recorded June 2020

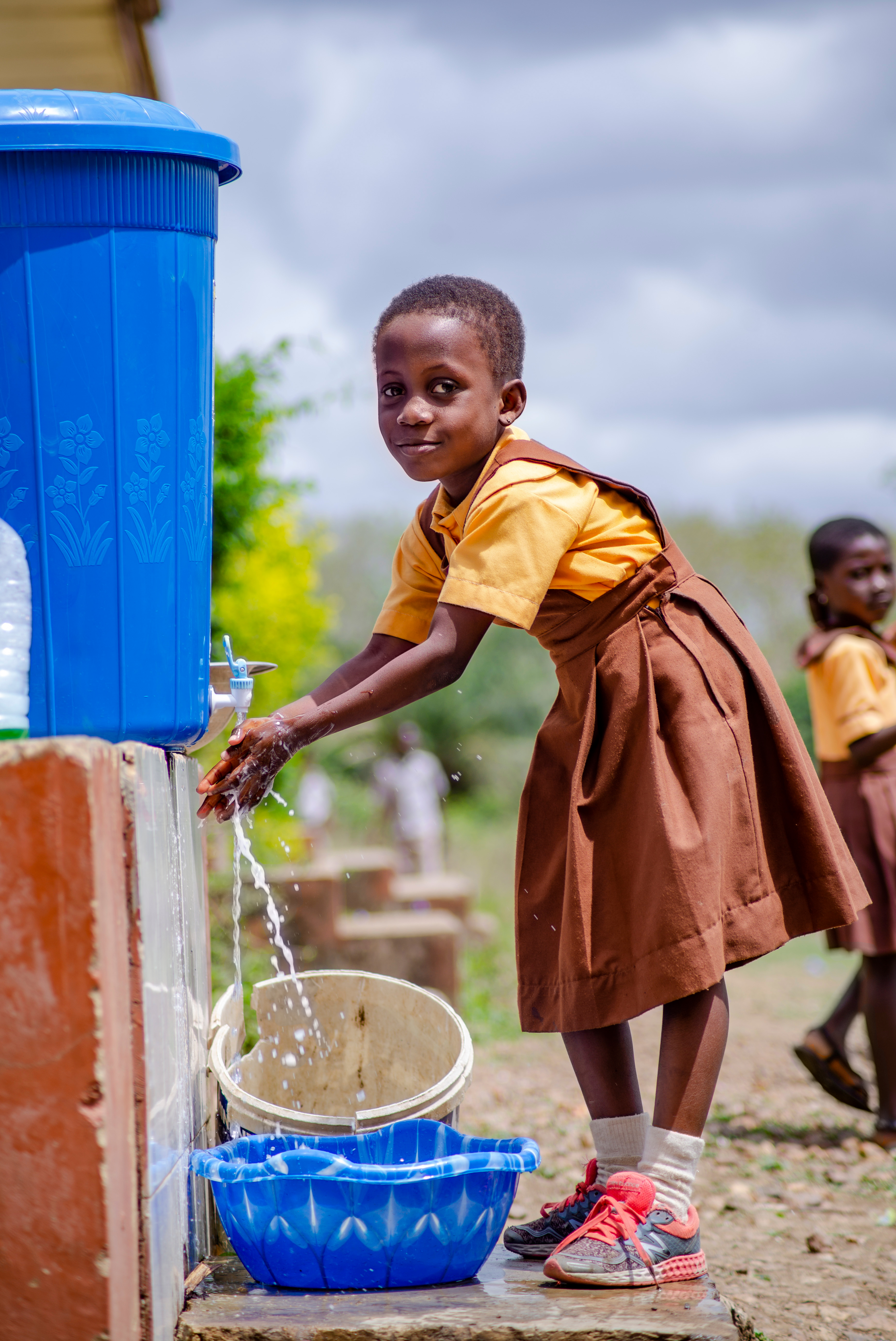
Girl in a school uniform using a Veronica bucket.

The Veronica bucket is a mechanism for hand washing originating in Ghana which consists of a bucket of water with a tap fixed at the bottom, mounted at hand height, and a bowl underneath to collect waste water. The Veronica bucket was developed by Veronica Bekoe. The Veronica bucket serves as a simple way to encourage proper hand washing using flowing water. Bekoe in an interview stated that the bucket was originally made to help her and her colleagues wash their hands under running water after each lab session. She said, "We are used to washing hands in a bowl with others washing in the same water, which will do more harm than good." These colleagues were contaminating their hands rather than decontaminating them. In addition to the COVID-related benefit of hand washing, the Veronica bucket is also essential for areas where potable water is not readily available.

== Uses ==
The bucket is also used in other African countries. It is common in places such as schools, hospitals, churches and areas with no running taps. It has become very popular in Ghana following the outbreak of the novel coronavirus (COVID-19) as citizens engage in frequent hand washing to stem its spread. In Ekiti State, Nigeria, the governor Kayode Fayemi directed all public places to provide running tap water or Veronica buckets "to encourage frequent handwashing" as part of the measures to contain COVID-19.

Before the COVID-19 outbreak, the invention was used in some schools and hospitals but now it is in high demand due to its role in curbing the outbreak. Now, the setup could be spotted in places like malls, hospitals, corporate institutions and government offices. It was invented by a Ghanaian, Veronica Bekoe, whom the invention was named after. She claimed the bucket was named after her in 1993 by Joan Hetrick. Bekoe is a biologist who has worked at the Public Health and Reference Laboratory of the Ghana Health Service from 1972 to 2008.

== Production ==
The invention was initially produced by local artisans with aluminium utensils used in selling Hausa koko attached with a tap which was a prototype, popularly known as Akorlaa gyae su and is currently made of plastic with a tap attached to it which has an area for holding soap and towels. Variations available today come in all colours.

In February 2021, Veronica Bekoe launched an updated version of the bucket to reduce physical contact with the unit and further help halt the spread of COVID-19.

== See also ==
- WASH (water, sanitation, hygiene)
