= Hand washing =

Act of cleaning one's hands

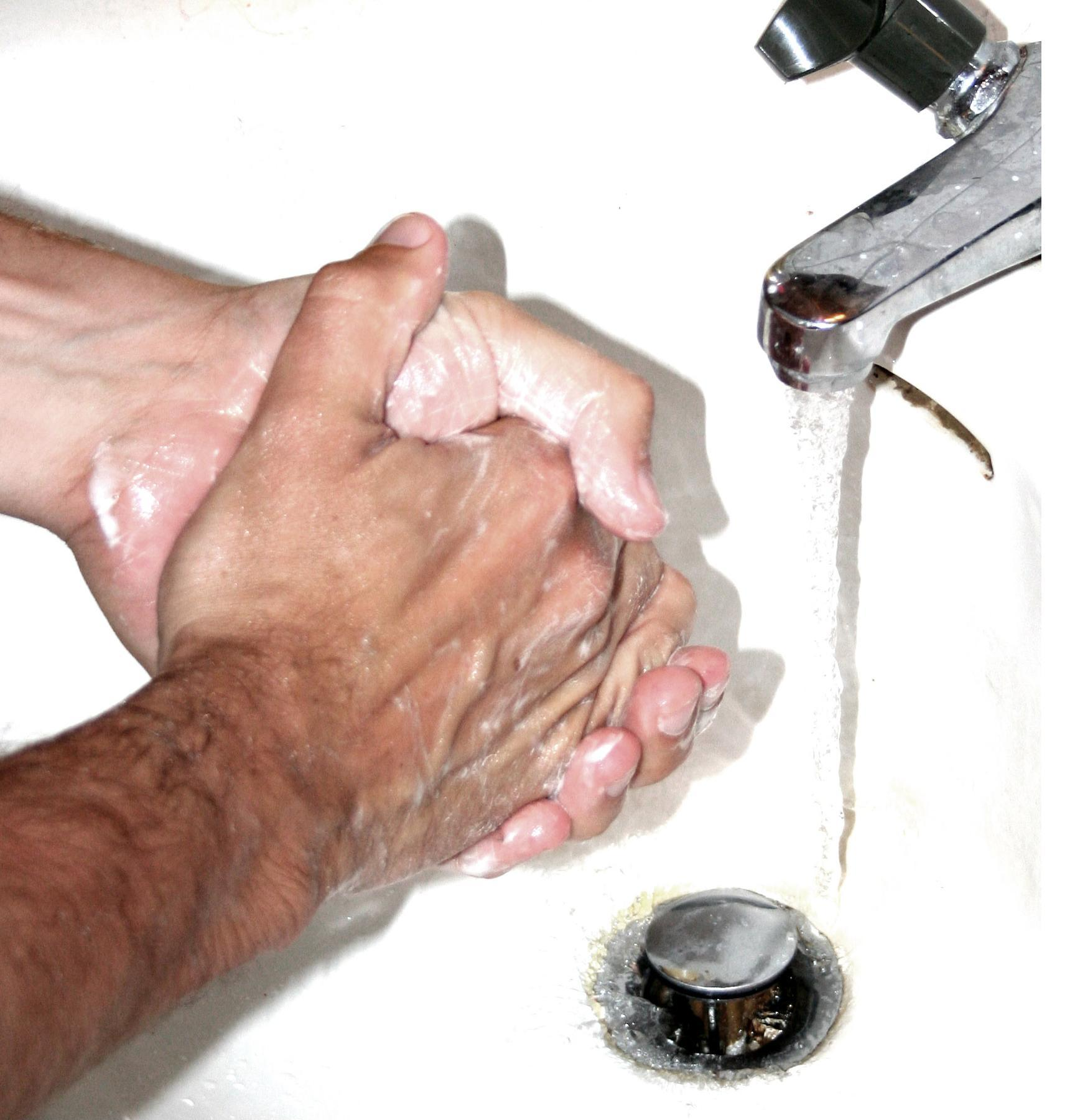
- Hand washing with soap and water at a sink
- Other names: Handwashing, hand hygiene

Hand washing (or handwashing), also called hand hygiene, is the process of cleaning the hands with soap or handwash and water to eliminate bacteria, viruses, dirt, microorganisms, and other potentially harmful substances. Drying of the washed hands is part of the process as wet and moist hands are more easily recontaminated. If soap and water are unavailable, hand sanitizer that is at least 60% (v/v) alcohol in water can be used as long as hands are not visibly excessively dirty or greasy. Hand hygiene is central to preventing the spread of infectious diseases in home and everyday life settings. Meta-analyses have shown that regular hand washing in community settings can significantly reduce respiratory and gastrointestinal infections.

The World Health Organization (WHO) recommends washing hands for at least 20 seconds before and after certain activities. These include the five critical times during the day where washing hands with soap is important to reduce fecal-oral transmission of disease: after using the toilet (for urination, defecation, menstrual hygiene), after cleaning a child's bottom (changing diapers), before feeding a child, before eating and before/after preparing food or handling raw meat, fish, or poultry.

When neither hand washing nor using hand sanitizer is possible, hands can be cleaned with uncontaminated ash and clean water, although the benefits and risks are uncertain for reducing the spread of viral or bacterial infections. However, frequent hand washing can lead to skin damage due to drying of the skin. Moisturizing lotion is often recommended to keep the hands from drying out; dry skin can lead to skin damage, which can increase the risk for the transmission of infection.

== Steps and duration ==
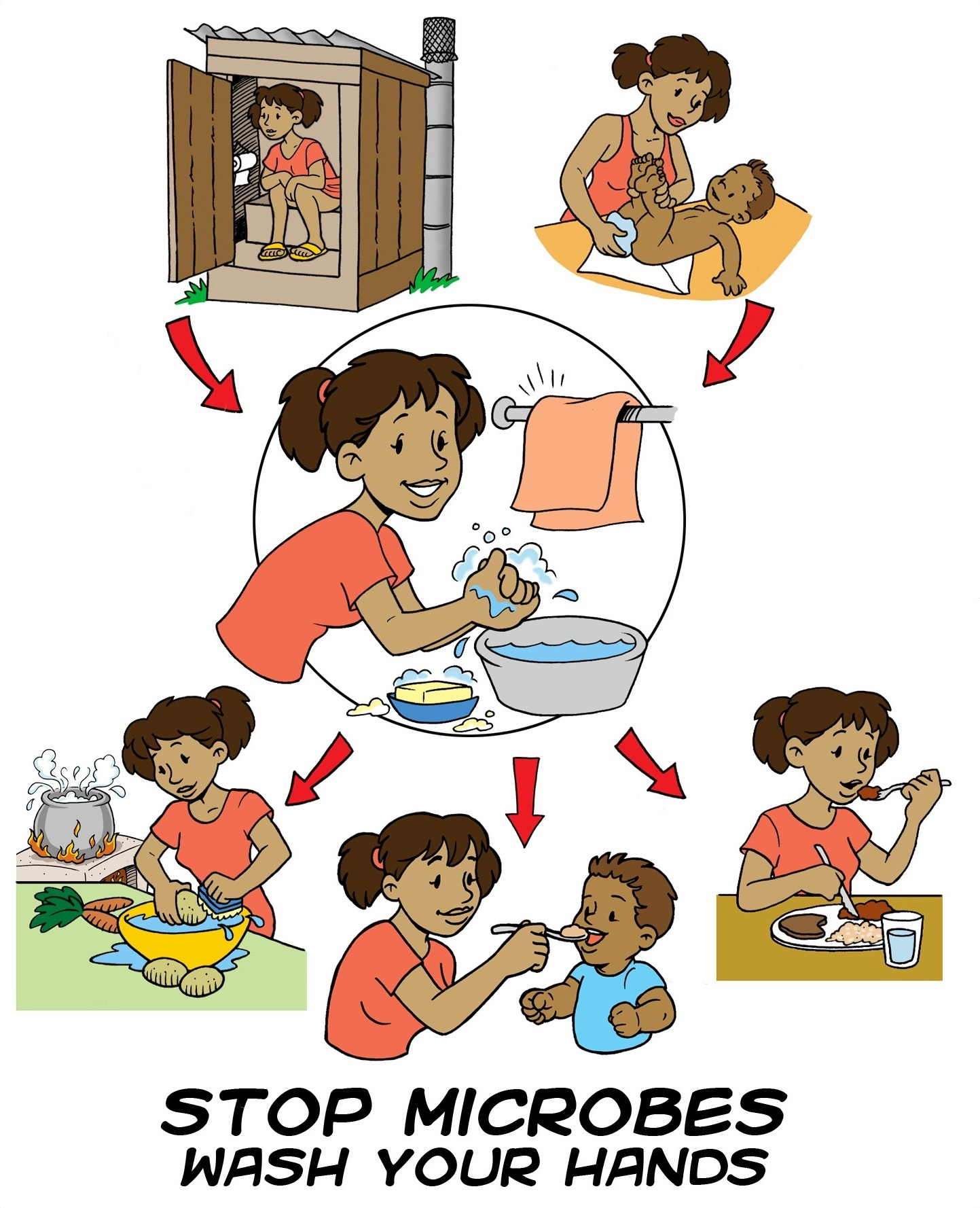
Poster about when to wash hands to raise awareness about hygiene

The United States Centers for Disease Control and Prevention (CDC) recommends the following steps when washing one's hands for the prevention of transmission of disease:

1. Wet hands with warm or cold running water. Running water is recommended because standing basins may be contaminated, while the temperature of the water does not seem to make a difference, however some experts suggest warm, tepid water may be superior.
2. Lather hands by rubbing them with a generous amount of soap, including the backs of hands, between fingers, and under nails. Soap lifts pathogens from the skin, and studies show that people tend to wash their hands more thoroughly when soap is used rather than water alone.
3. Scrub for at least 20 seconds. Scrubbing creates friction, which helps remove pathogens from skin, and scrubbing for longer periods removes more pathogens. According to the CDC, scrubbing with soap for at least 20 seconds is necessary to remove most germs effectively, regardless of water temperature.
4. Rinse well under running water. Rinsing in a basin can recontaminate hands.
5. Dry with a clean towel or allow to air dry. Wet and moist hands are more easily recontaminated.

The most commonly missed areas are the thumb, the wrist, the areas between the fingers, and under fingernails. Artificial nails and chipped nail polish may harbor microorganisms.

=== When it is recommended ===
There are five critical times during the day where washing hands with soap is important to reduce fecal-oral transmission of disease: after using the toilet (for urination, defecation, menstrual hygiene), after cleaning a child's bottom (changing diapers), before feeding a child, before eating and before/after preparing food or handling raw meat, fish, or poultry. Other occasions when proper hand washing techniques should be practiced to prevent the transmission of disease include before and after treating a cut or wound; after sneezing, coughing, or blowing your nose; after touching animal waste or handling animals; and after touching garbage. In healthcare settings, the WHO (World Health Organization) also recommends "Five Moments for Hand Hygiene" before patient contact, before aseptic tasks, after exposure to body fluids, after patient contact, and after contact with patient surroundings.

== Public health ==
=== Health benefits ===
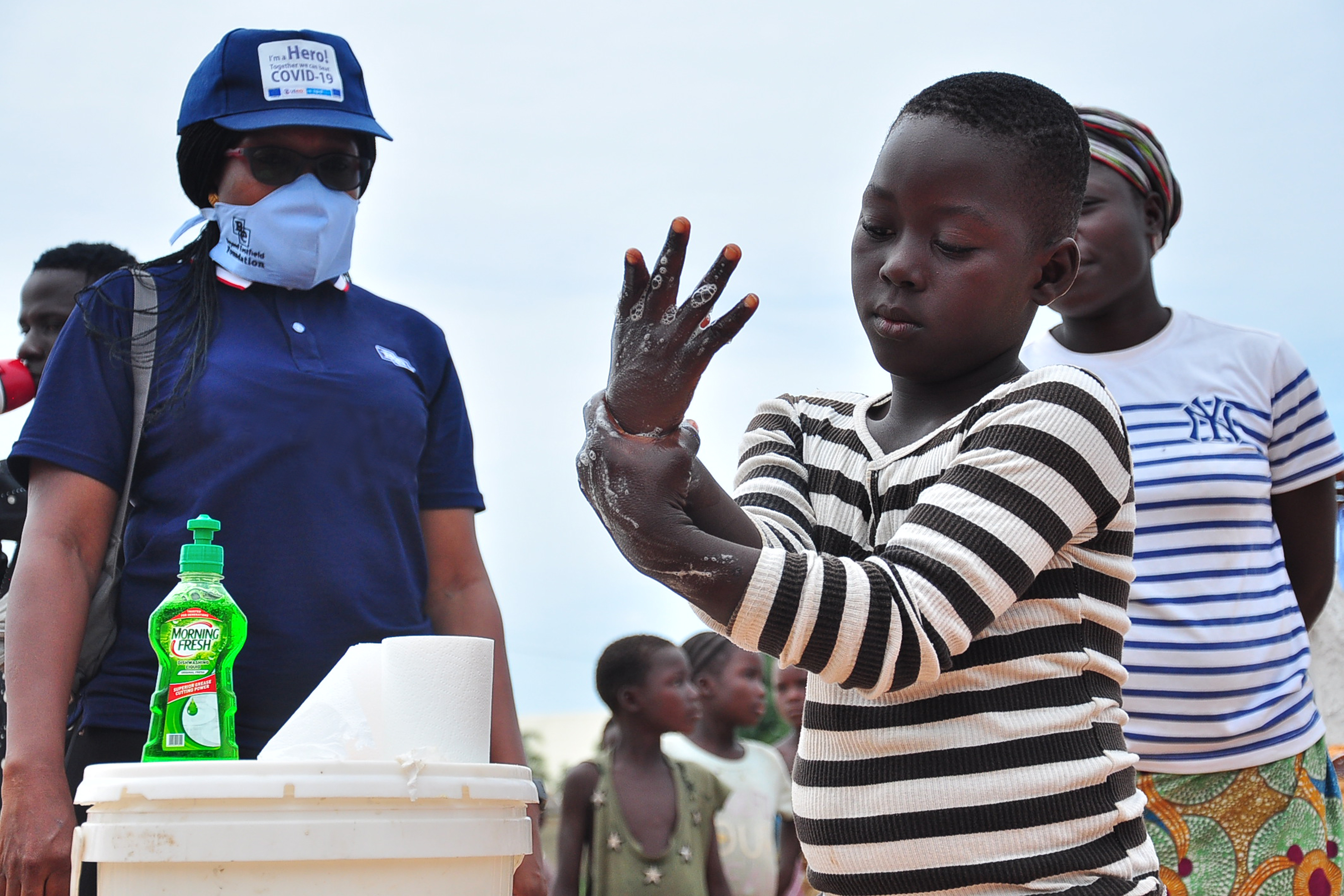
Building a culture of handwashing with children can create a change in culture with widespread public health benefits.

Hand washing has many significant health benefits, including minimizing the spread of influenza, COVID-19, and other infectious diseases; preventing infectious causes of diarrhea; decreasing respiratory infections; and reducing infant mortality rate at home birth deliveries. A 2013 study showed that improved hand washing practices may lead to small improvements in the length growth in children under five years of age. Studies have shown that humans often touch their face over 20 times per hour; touching contaminated surfaces and their ones face can lead to viral transmission. In developing countries, childhood mortality rates related to respiratory and diarrheal diseases can be reduced by introducing simple behavioral changes, such as hand washing with soap. This simple action can reduce the rate of mortality from these diseases by almost 50%. Interventions that promote hand washing can reduce diarrhea episodes by about a third, and this is comparable to providing clean water in low income areas. 48% of reductions in diarrhea episodes can be associated with hand washing with soap.

Handwashing with soap is the single most effective and inexpensive way to prevent diarrhea and acute respiratory infections (ARI), as automatic behavior performed in homes, schools, and communities worldwide. Pneumonia, a major ARI, is the number one cause of mortality among children under five years old, taking the lives of an estimated 1.8 million children per year. Diarrhea and pneumonia together account for almost 3.5 million child deaths annually. According to UNICEF, turning handwashing with soap before eating and after using the toilet into an ingrained habit can save more lives than any single vaccine or medical intervention, cutting deaths from diarrhea by almost half and deaths from acute respiratory infections by one-quarter. Hand washing is usually integrated with other sanitation interventions as part of water, sanitation, and hygiene (WASH) programs. Hand washing also protects against impetigo which is transmitted through direct physical contact.

Number without basic handwashing

Death rates for no access to handwashing

Deaths due to lack of access to hand washing facilities

Proportion of population with basic handwashing facilities on premises

Rural without basic handwashing

=== Adverse effects ===
A small detrimental effect of handwashing is that frequent hand washing can lead to skin damage due to the drying of the skin. A 2012 Danish study found that excessive hand washing can lead to an itchy, flaky skin condition known as contact dermatitis, which is especially common among health-care workers. Frequent use of alcohol based hand sanitizers can also contribute to skin irritation and dryness, although this effect may be reduced by formulations that include moisturizers.

=== Behavior change ===
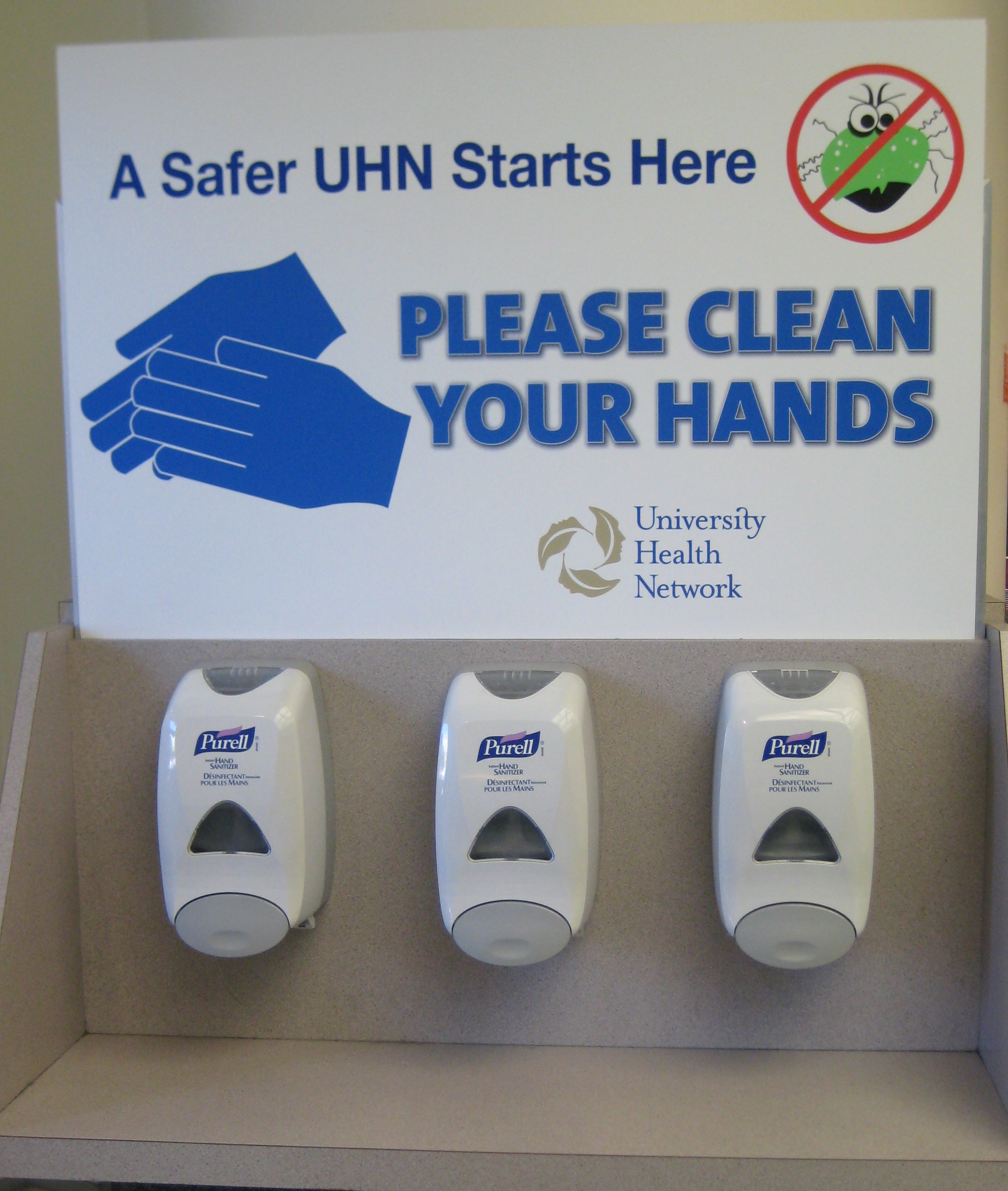
Hand cleaning station at the entrance of the Toronto General Hospital, Canada

In many countries, there is a low rate of hand washing with soap. A study of hand washing in 54 countries in 2015 found that on average, 38.7% of households practiced hand washing with soap.

A 2014 study showed that Saudi Arabia had the highest rate of 97%; the United States near the middle with 77%; and China with the lowest rate of 23%.

Several behavior change methodologies now exist to increase uptake of the behavior of hand washing with soap at the critical times.

Group hand washing for school children at set times of the day is one option in developing countries to engrain hand washing in children's behaviors. The "Essential Health Care Program" implemented by the Department of Education in the Philippines is an example of at scale action to promote children's health and education. Deworming twice a year, supplemented with washing hands daily with soap, brushing teeth daily with fluoride, is at the core of this national program. It has also been successfully implemented in Indonesia.

=== Recent Global Initiatives (2020-present) ===
In recent years, hand hygiene has remained central to global infection prevention efforts, particularly following the COVID-19 pandemic. The World Health Organization (WHO) reported in 2023 that fewer than 60% of health-care facilities in low- and middle-income countries have adequate hand hygiene resources at points of care. To address this gap, the WHO and UNICEF launched the Hand Hygiene for All initiative in 2020 to promote integration of hand hygiene into national health policies. Early research emphasized the critical role of hand hygiene in preventing health care–associated infections. Sustained behavioral interventions and system-level investments remain essential to improve compliance and reduce health care–associated infections worldwide. Improving hand hygiene practices is also a key target within the WHO Global Patient Safety Action Plan 2021–2030, which aims to reduce health care–associated infections and antimicrobial resistance.

In 2025, the World Health Organization introduced updated hand-hygiene recommendations emphasizing the need for reliable access to water, soap, and alcohol-based hand rubs with safe grey-water disposal; clear guidance on when, why, and how hand hygiene should be performed; and a supportive physical and social environment that ensures facilities are accessible and convenient.

== Substances used ==
=== Soap and detergents ===
Removal of microorganisms from skin is enhanced by the addition of soaps or detergents to water. Soap and detergents are surfactants that kill microorganisms by disorganizing their membrane lipid bilayer and denaturing their proteins. It also emulsifies oils, enabling them to be carried away by running water.

==== Solid soap ====
Solid soap, because of its reusable nature, may hold bacteria acquired from previous uses. A small number of studies which have looked at the bacterial transfer from contaminated solid soap have concluded transfer is unlikely as the bacteria are rinsed off with the foam. The CDC still states "liquid soap with hands-free controls for dispensing is preferable".

==== Antibacterial soap ====
Antibacterial soaps have been heavily promoted to a health-conscious public. To date, there is no evidence that using recommended antiseptics or disinfectants selects for antibiotic-resistant organisms in nature. However, antibacterial soaps contain common antibacterial agents such as triclosan, which has an extensive list of resistant strains of organisms. So, even if antibiotic resistant strains are not selected for by antibacterial soaps, they might not be as effective as they are marketed to be. Besides the surfactant and skin-protecting agent, the sophisticated formulations may contain acids (acetic acid, ascorbic acid, lactic acid) as pH regulator, antimicrobially active benzoic acid and further skin conditioners (aloe vera, vitamins, menthol, plant extracts).

A 2007 meta-analysis from the University of Oregon School of Public Health indicated that plain soaps are as effective as consumer-grade anti-bacterial soaps containing triclosan in preventing illness and removing bacteria from the hands. Dissenting, a 2011 meta-analysis in the Journal of Food Protection argued that when properly formulated, triclosan can grant a small but detectable improvement, as can chlorhexidine gluconate, iodophor, or povidone.

=== Warm water ===
Hot water that is still comfortable for washing hands is not hot enough to kill bacteria. Bacteria grow much faster at body temperature (37 °C). WHO considers warm soapy water to be more effective than cold, soapy water at removing natural oils which hold soils and bacteria. But CDC mentions that warm water causes skin irritations more often and its ecological footprint is more significant. Water temperatures from 4 to 40 °C do not differ significantly regarding removal of microbes. The most important factor is proper scrubbing.

Contrary to popular belief, scientific studies have shown that using warm water has no effect on reducing the microbial load on hands. Using hot water for handwashing can even be regarded as a waste of energy.

=== Antiseptics (hand sanitizer) ===
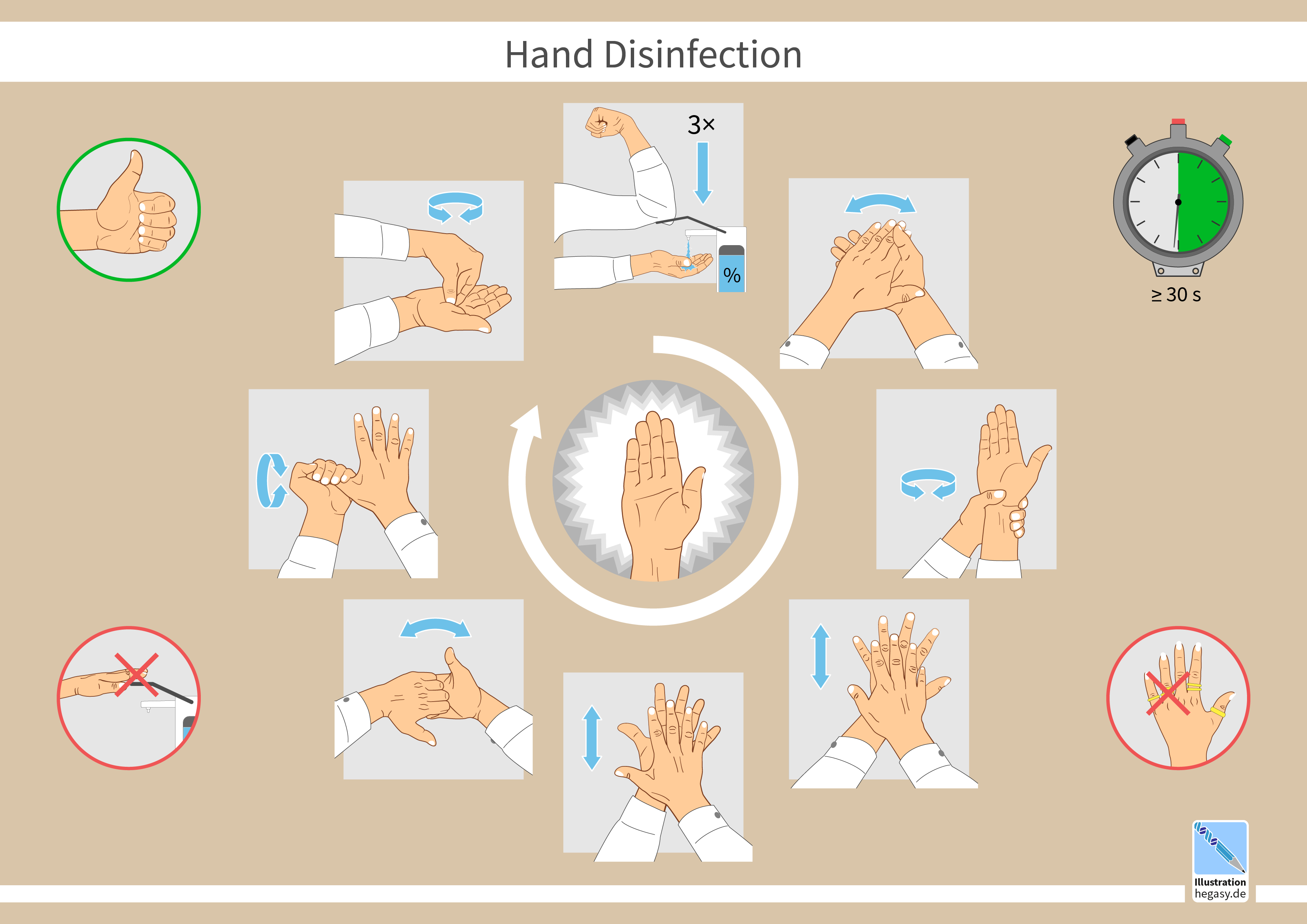
Hand disinfection procedure according to the German standard DIN EN 1500

In situations where hand washing with soap is not an option (e.g., when in a public place with no access to wash facilities), a waterless hand sanitizer such as an alcohol hand gel can be used. They can be used in addition to hand washing to minimize risks when caring for "at-risk" groups. To be effective, alcohol hand gels should contain not less than 60%v/v alcohol. Enough hand antiseptic or alcohol rub must be used to thoroughly wet or cover both hands. The front and back of both hands and between and the ends of all fingers must be rubbed for approximately 30 seconds until the liquid, foam or gel is dry. Fingertips must be washed well too, rubbing them in both palms.

A hand sanitizer or hand antiseptic is a non-water-based hand hygiene agent. In the late 1990s and early part of the 21st century, alcohol rub non-water-based hand hygiene agents (also known as alcohol-based hand rubs, antiseptic hand rubs, or hand sanitizers) began to gain popularity. Most are based on isopropyl alcohol or ethanol formulated together with a thickening agent such as Carbomer (polymer of acrylic acid) into a gel, or a humectant such as glycerin into a liquid, or foam for ease of use and to decrease the drying effect of the alcohol. Adding diluted hydrogen peroxide increases further the antimicrobial activity.

Hand sanitizers are most effective against bacteria and less effective against some viruses. Alcohol-based hand sanitizers are almost entirely ineffective against norovirus (or Norwalk) type viruses, the most common cause of contagious gastroenteritis.

US Centers for Disease Control and Prevention recommend hand washing with soap over hand sanitizer rubs, particularly when hands are visibly dirty. The increasing use of these agents is based on their ease of use and rapid killing activity against micro-organisms; however, they should not serve as a replacement for proper hand washing unless soap and water are unavailable. Despite their effectiveness, non-water agents do not cleanse the hands of organic material but simply disinfect them. It is for this reason that hand sanitizers are not as effective as soap and water at preventing the spread of many pathogens, since the pathogens remain on the hands.

=== Wipes ===
Hand washing using hand sanitizing wipes is an alternative during traveling in the absence of soap and water. Alcohol-based hand sanitizer should contain at least 60% alcohol.

=== Ash or mud ===
Many people in low-income communities cannot afford soap and use ash or soil instead. The World Health Organization recommended ash or sand as an alternative to soap when soap is not available. Use of ash is common in rural areas of developing countries and has, in experiments, been shown at least as effective as soap for removing pathogens. However, evidence to support the use of ash to wash hands is of poor quality. It is not clear if washing hands with ash is effective at reducing viral or bacterial spreading compared to washing with mud, not washing, or with washing with water alone. There is a concern that if the soil or ash used is contaminated with microorganisms, handwashing with these materials could potentially spread disease rather than reduce it. However, there is also no clear evidence to determine the level of risk. Like soap, ash is also a disinfecting agent because in contact with water, it forms an alkaline solution.

== Technologies and design aspects ==
=== Low-cost options when water is scarce ===
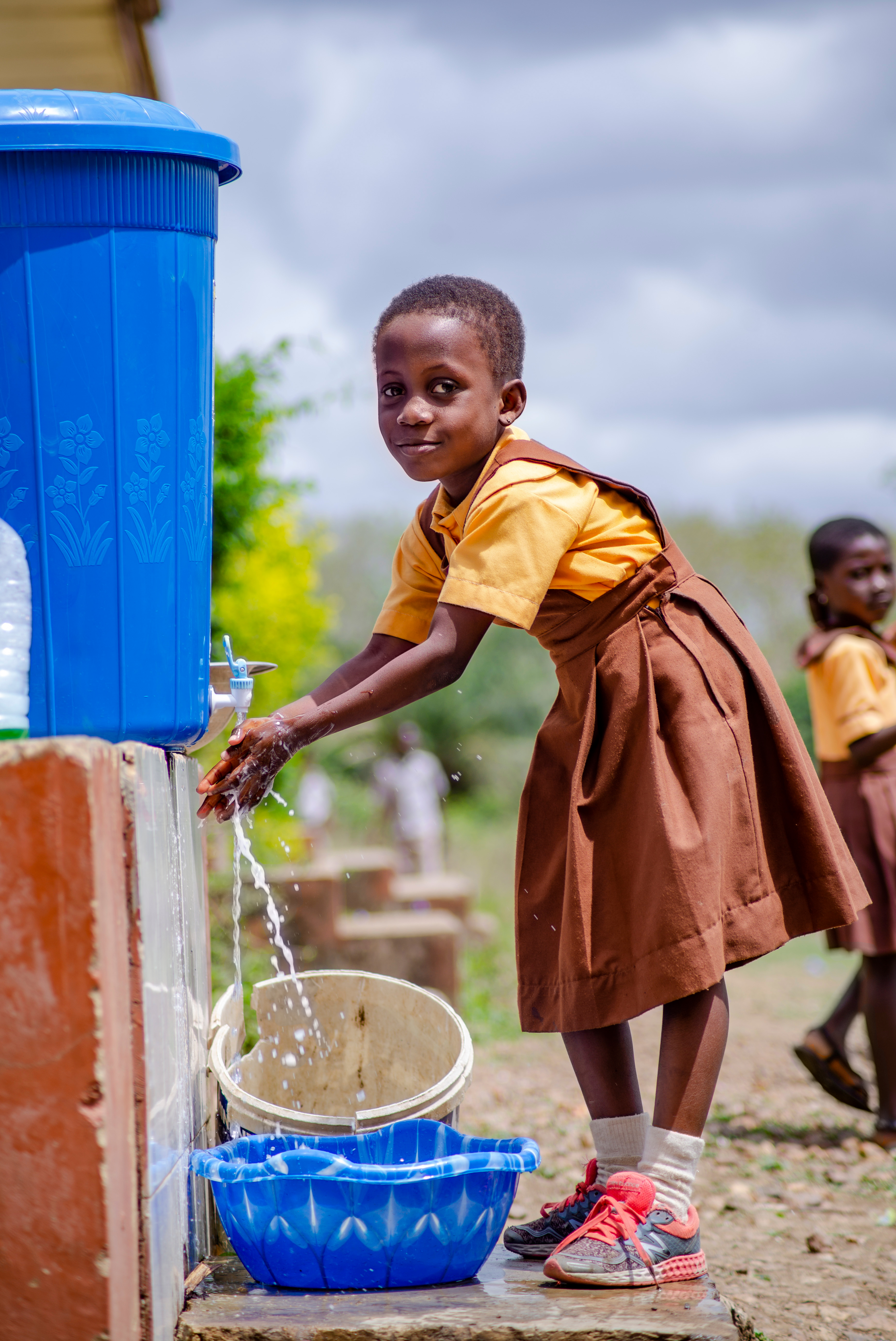
A school girl using a Veronica Bucket in Ghana for handwashing

Various low-cost options can be made to facilitate hand washing where tap-water and/or soap is not available e.g. pouring water from a hanging jerrycan or gourd with suitable holes and/or using ash if needed in developing countries.

In situations with limited water supply (such as schools or rural areas in developing countries), there are water-conserving solutions, such as "tippy-taps" and other low-cost options. A tippy-tap is a simple technology using a jug suspended by a rope, and a foot-operated lever to pour a small amount of water over the hands and a bar of soap.

Low-cost hand washing technologies for households may differ from facilities for multiple users. For households, options include tippy taps, bucket/container with tap (such as a Veronica Bucket), conventional tap with/without basin, valve/tap fitted to bottles, bucket and cup, camp sink. Options for multiple users include: adapting household technologies for multiple users, water container fitted to a pipe with multiple taps, water container fitted to a pipe with holes.

=== Advanced technologies ===
Several companies around the globe have developed technologies that aim to improve the hand washing process. Among the different inventions, there are eco-friendly devices that use 90% less water and 60% less soap compared to hand washing under a faucet. Another device uses light-based rays to detect contaminants on the hands after they have been washed.

Certain environments are especially sensitive to the transmission of pathogenic microorganisms, like health care and food production. Organizations attempting to prevent infection transmission in these environments have started using programmed washing cycles that provide sufficient time for scrubbing the hands with soap and rinsing them with water. Combined with AI-powered software, these technological advancements turn the hand-washing process into digital data, allowing individuals to receive insights and improve their hand hygiene practices.

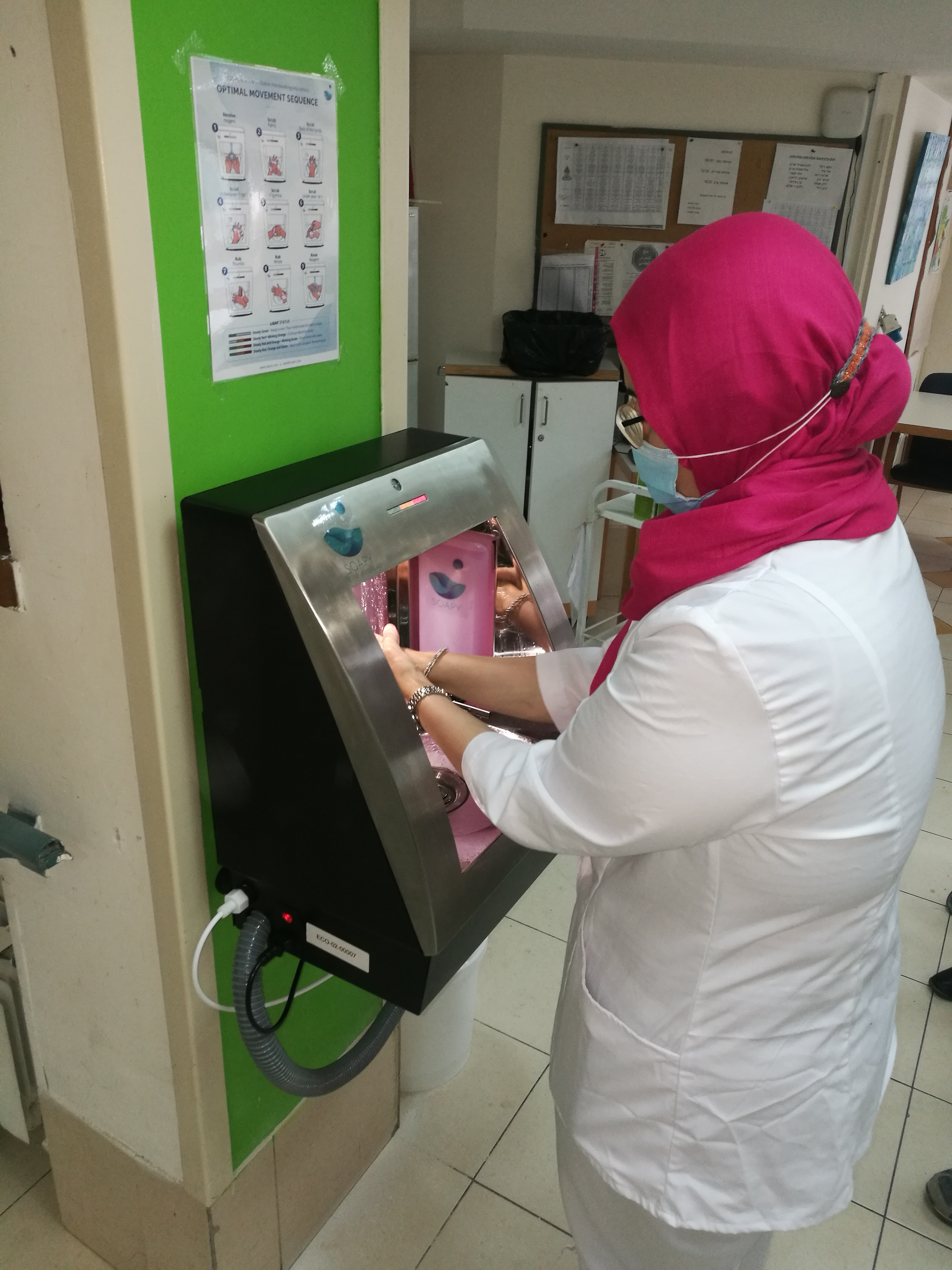
A nurse uses a smart hand washing device.

=== Drying with towels or hand driers ===
Effective drying of the hands is an essential part of the hand hygiene process. Therefore, the proper drying of hands after washing should be an integral part of the hand hygiene process in health care.

The World Health Organization (WHO) and the Centers for Disease Control and Prevention (CDC) are clear and straightforward concerning hand hygiene, and recommend paper towels and hand dryers equally. Both have stressed the importance of frequent and thorough hand washing followed by their complete drying as a means to stop the spread of pathogens, like COVID-19. Specifically, the World Health Organization recommends that everyone "frequently clean [their] hands..." and "dry [them] thoroughly by using paper towels or a warm air dryer." The CDC report that, "Both [clean towels or air hand dryers] are effective ways to dry hands."

A study in 2020 found that hand dryers and paper towels were both found to be equally hygienic hand-drying solutions.

However, there is some debate over the most effective form of drying in public toilets. A growing volume of research suggests paper towels are much more hygienic than the electric hand dryers found in many public toilets. A review in 2012 concluded that "From a hygiene standpoint, paper towels are superior to air dryers; therefore, paper towels should be recommended for use in locations in which hygiene is paramount, such as hospitals and clinics."

Jet-air dryers were found to be capable of blowing micro-organisms from the hands and the unit and potentially contaminating other users and the environment up to 2 metres (6.6 feet) away. In the same study in 2008 (sponsored by the paper-towel industry the European Tissue Symposium), use of a warm-air hand dryer spread micro-organisms only up to 0.25 metres (0.82 feet) from the dryer, and paper towels showed no significant spread of micro-organisms. No studies have found a correlation to hand dryers and human health, however, making these findings inconsequential.

=== Accessibility ===
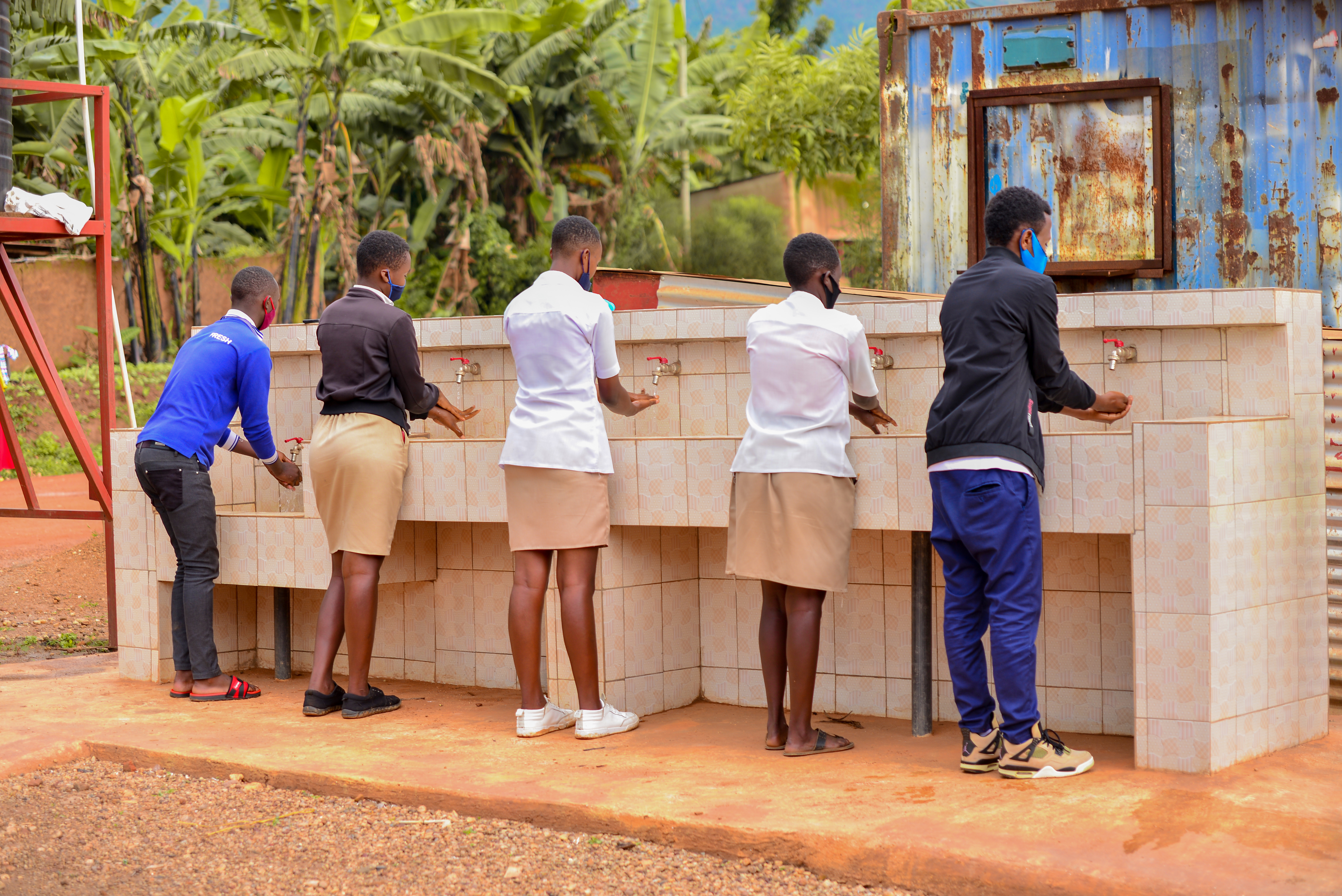
A community handwashing facility in Rwanda with sinks for people of different heights. During the COVID-19 pandemic in Rwanda handwashing was part of a system of public health measures encouraged to reduce transmission.

Making hand washing facilities accessible (inclusive) to everyone is crucial to maintain hand washing behavior. Considerations for accessibility include age, disability, seasonality (with rains and muddiness), location and more. Important aspects for good accessibility include: Placement of the technology, paths, ramps, steps, type of tap, soap placement.

== Medical use ==
Medical hand-washing became mandatory long after Hungarian physician Ignaz Semmelweis discovered its effectiveness (in 1846) in preventing disease in a hospital environment. There are electronic devices that provide feedback to remind hospital staff to wash their hands when they forget. One study has found decreased infection rates with their use.

=== Method ===
Medical hand-washing is for a minimum of 15 seconds, using generous amounts of soap and water or gel to lather and rub each part of the hands. Hands should be rubbed together with digits interlocking. If there is debris under fingernails, a bristle brush may be used to remove it. Since pathogens may remain in the water on the hands, it is important to rinse well and wipe dry with a clean towel. After drying, the paper towel should be used to turn off the water (and open any exit door if necessary). This avoids re-contaminating the hands from those surfaces.

The purpose of hand-washing in the health-care setting is to remove pathogenic microorganisms ("germs") and avoid transmitting them. The New England Journal of Medicine reports that a lack of hand-washing remains at unacceptable levels in most medical environments, with large numbers of doctors and nurses routinely forgetting to wash their hands before touching patients, thus transmitting microorganisms. One study showed that proper hand-washing and other simple procedures can decrease the rate of catheter-related bloodstream infections by 66%.

Video demonstration on hand washing

The World Health Organization has published a sheet demonstrating standard hand-washing and hand-rubbing in health-care sectors. The draft guidance of hand hygiene by the organization can also be found at its website for public comment. A relevant review was conducted by Whitby et al. Commercial devices can measure and validate hand hygiene, if demonstration of regulatory compliance is required.

The World Health Organization has "Five Moments" for washing hands:

- before patient care
- after environmental contact
- after exposure to blood/body fluids
- before an aseptic task, and
- after patient care.

The addition of antiseptic chemicals to soap ("medicated" or "antimicrobial" soaps) confers killing action to a hand-washing agent. Such killing action may be desired before performing surgery or in settings in which antibiotic-resistant organisms are highly prevalent.

To 'scrub' one's hands for a surgical operation, it is necessary to have a tap that can be turned on and off without touching it with the hands, some chlorhexidine or iodine wash, sterile towels for drying the hands after washing, and a sterile brush for scrubbing and another sterile instrument for cleaning under the fingernails. All jewelry should be removed. This procedure requires washing the hands and forearms up to the elbow, usually 2–6 minutes. Long scrub-times (10 minutes) are not necessary. When rinsing, water on the forearms must be prevented from running back to the hands. After hand-washing is completed, the hands are dried with a sterile cloth and a surgical gown is donned.

=== Effectiveness in healthcare settings ===
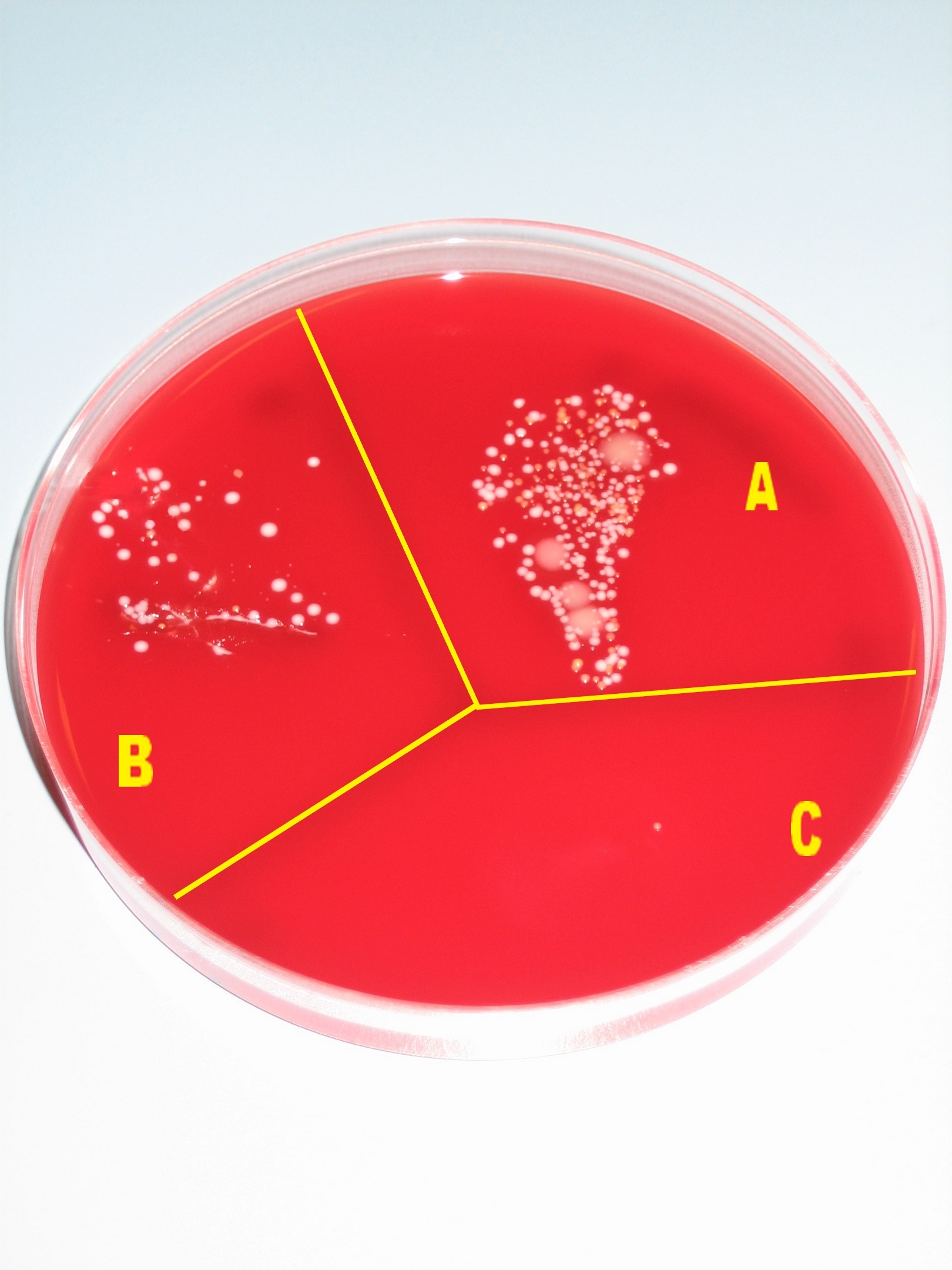
Microbial growth on a cultivation plate without procedures (A), after washing hands with soap (B) and after disinfection with alcohol (C)

To reduce the spread of pathogens, it is better to wash the hands or use a hand antiseptic before and after tending to a sick person.

For control of staphylococcal infections in hospitals, it has been found that the greatest benefit from hand-cleansing came from the first 20% of washing, and that very little additional benefit was gained when hand cleansing frequency was increased beyond 35%. Washing with plain soap results in more than triple the rate of bacterial infectious disease transmitted to food as compared to washing with antibacterial soap.

Comparing hand-rubbing with alcohol-based solution with hand washing with antibacterial soap for a median time of 30 seconds each showed that the alcohol hand-rubbing reduced bacterial contamination 26% more than the antibacterial soap. But soap and water is more effective than alcohol-based hand rubs for reducing H1N1 influenza A virus and Clostridioides difficile spores from hands.

Interventions to improve hand hygiene in healthcare settings can involve education for staff on hand washing, increasing the availability of alcohol-based hand rub, and written and verbal reminders to staff. There is a need for more research into which of these interventions are most effective in different healthcare settings.

== Developing countries ==
Share rural basic handwashing

World map for SDG 6 Indicator 6.2.1b in 2022: "Share of the population with basic handwashing facilities on premises"

In developing countries, hand washing with soap is recognized as a cost-effective, essential tool for achieving good health, and even good nutrition. However, a lack of reliable water supply, soap or hand washing facilities in people's homes, at schools and the workplace make it a challenge to achieve universal hand washing behaviors. For example, in most of rural Africa hand washing taps close to every private or public toilet are scarce, even though cheap options exist to build hand washing stations. However, low hand washing rates can also be the result of engrained habits rather than due to a lack of soap or water.

Hand washing at a global level has its own indicator within Sustainable Development Goal 6, Target 6.2 which states "By 2030, achieve access to adequate and equitable sanitation and hygiene for all and end open defecation, paying special attention to the needs of women and girls and those in vulnerable situations. The corresponding Indicator 6.2.1 is formulated as follows: "Proportion of population using (a) safely managed sanitation services and (b) a hand-washing facility with soap and water" (see map to the right with data worldwide from 2017)."

=== Promotion campaigns ===
The promotion and advocacy of hand washing with soap can influence policy decisions, raise awareness about the benefits of hand washing and lead to long-term behavior change of the population. For this to work effectively, monitoring and evaluation are necessary. A systematic review of 70 studies found that community-based approaches are effective at increasing hand washing in LMICs, while social marketing campaigns are less effective.

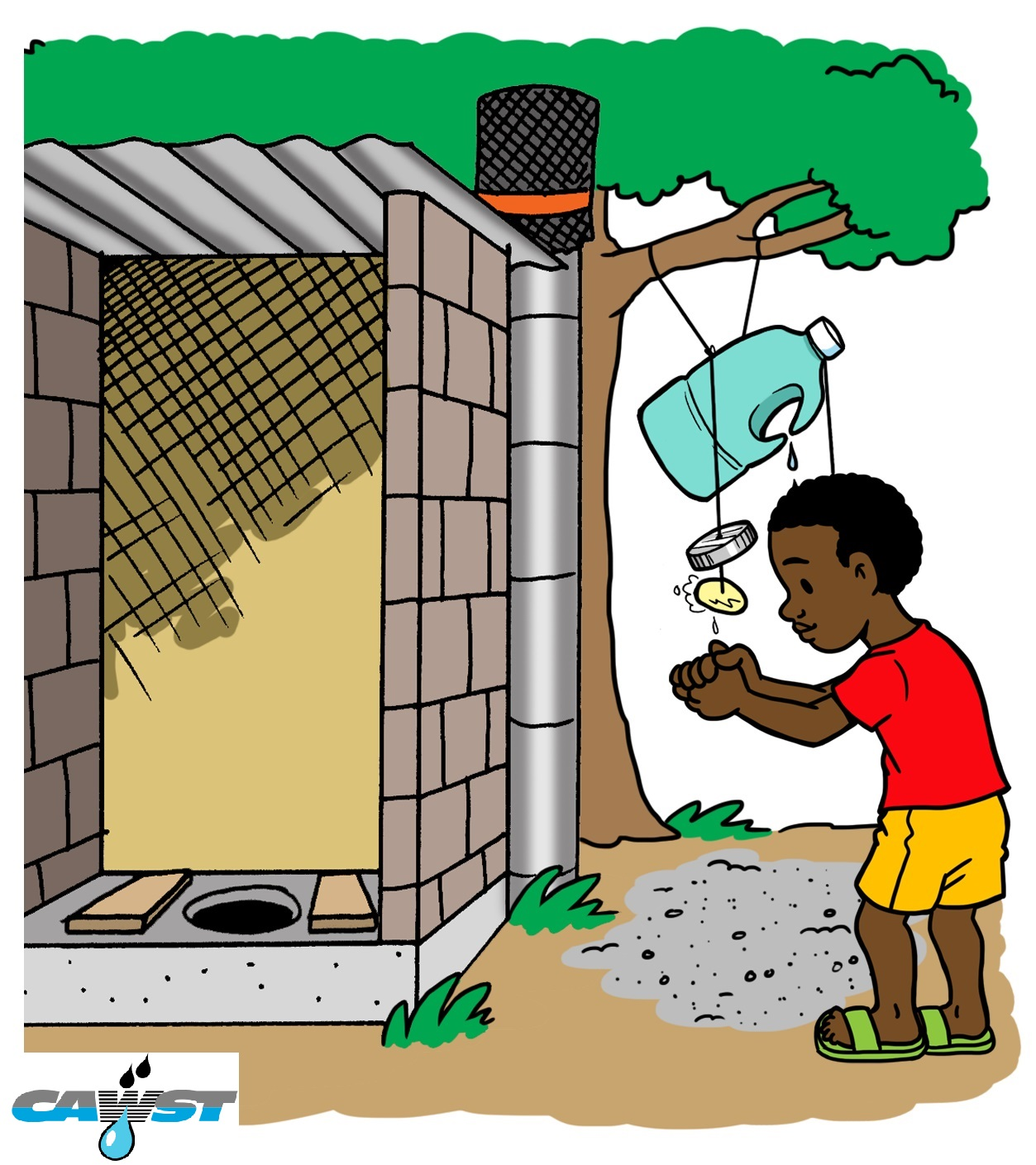
Poster used in Africa for raising awareness about hand washing after using the toilet with simple low-cost hand washing device

One example for hand washing promotion in schools is the "Three Star Approach" by UNICEF that encourages schools to take simple, inexpensive steps to ensure that students wash their hands with soap, among other hygienic requirements. When minimum standards are achieved, schools can move from one to ultimately three stars. Building hand washing stations can be a part of hand washing promotion campaigns that are carried out to reduce diseases and child mortality.

Global Handwashing Day is another example of an awareness-raising campaign that is trying to achieve behavior change. World Hand Hygiene Day, which is commemorated annually on 5 May, is a global initiative aimed at promoting awareness of the pivotal role of hand hygiene in preventing infections in healthcare settings. The programme was initiated by the World Health Organization (WHO) in 2009.

As a result of the ongoing COVID-19 pandemic, UNICEF promoted the adoption of a hand washing emoji.

Designing hand washing facilities that encourage use can use the following aspects:

- Nudges, cues and reminders
- Hand washing facilities should be placed at convenient locations to encourage people to use them regularly and at the right times; they should be attractive and well maintained.

=== Cost effectiveness ===
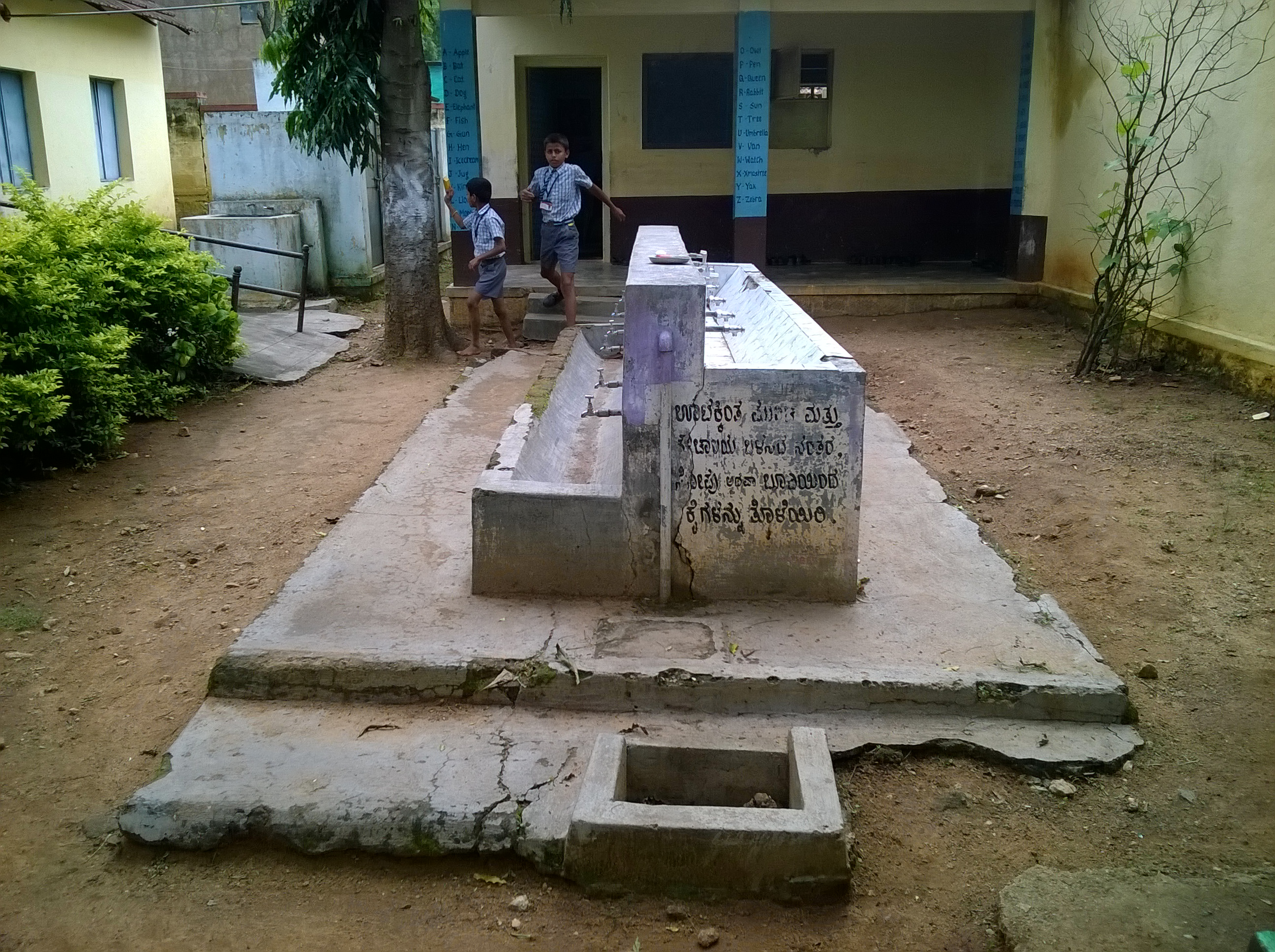
Hand washing stands at a school in Mysore district, Karnataka, India

Few studies have considered the overall cost effectiveness of hand washing in developing countries in relationship to DALYs averted. However, one review suggests that promoting hand washing with soap is significantly more cost-effective than other water and sanitation interventions.

Cost-Effectiveness of Water Supply, Sanitation and Hygiene Promotion
Intervention	Costs (US$/DALY)
Hand-pump or standpost	94
House water connection	223
Water sector regulation	47
Basic sanitation – construction and promotion	≤270
Sanitation promotion only	11.2
Hygiene promotion	3.4

== History ==
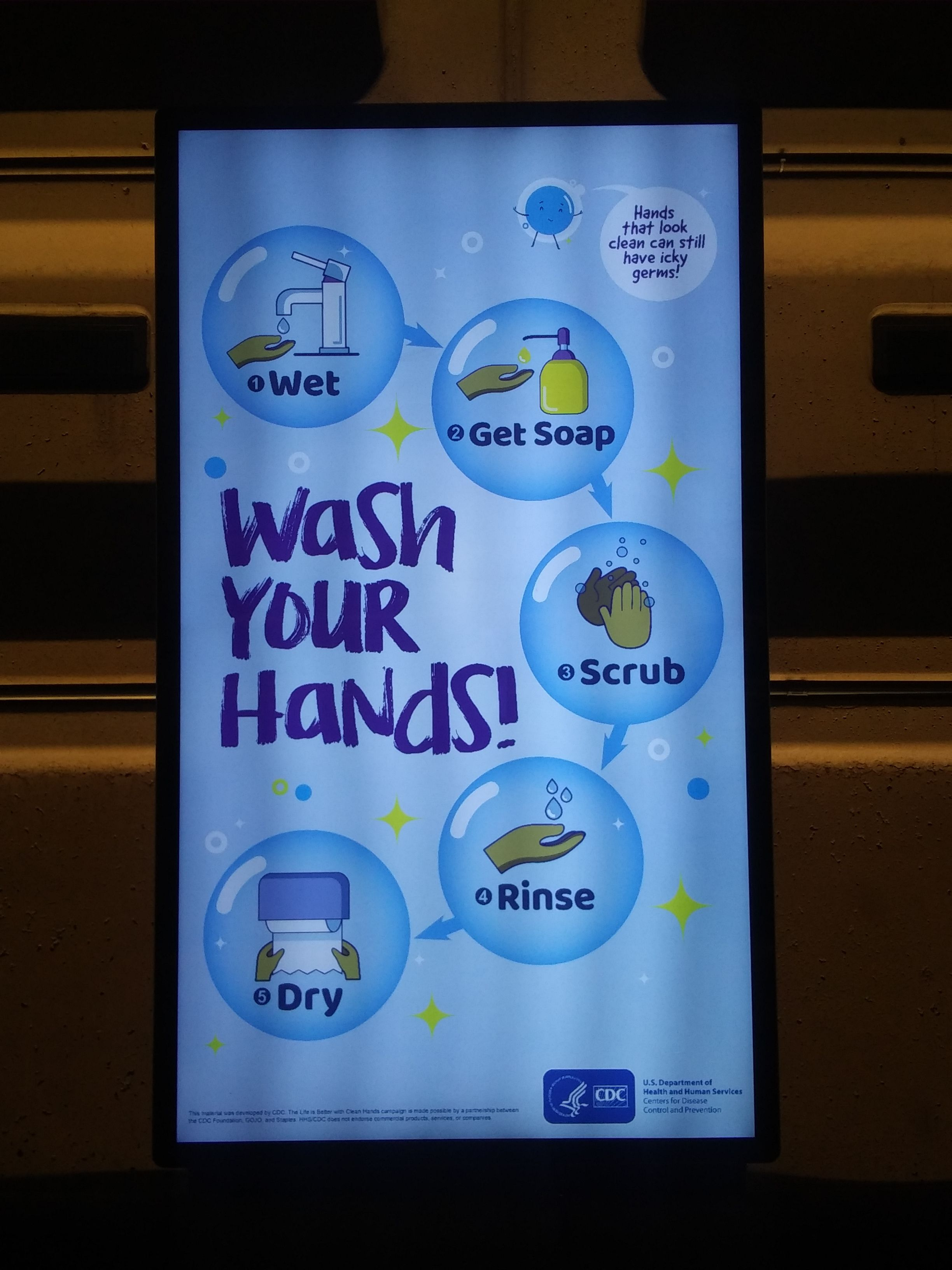
Electronic sign inside a Washington Metro station during the COVID-19 pandemic

The importance of hand washing for human health – particularly for people in vulnerable circumstances like mothers who had just given birth or wounded soldiers in hospitals – was recognized by several pioneers of medicine during the 18th and 19th century: the English obstetrician Charles White in 1777, the Scottish physician Alexander Gordon in 1795, the Scottish obstetrician James Young Simpson in 1840, the American physician Oliver Wendell Holmes in 1843; the Hungarian obstetrician Ignaz Semmelweis in 1847; and Florence Nightingale, the English "founder of modern nursing", during the Crimean War. At the time, most people still believed that infections were caused by foul odors called miasmas.

In 1975 and 1985, the it Centers for Disease Control and Prevention (CDC) published formal guidelines for handwashing practices in hospitals.

In the 1980s, foodborne outbreaks and healthcare-associated infections led the United States Centers for Disease Control and Prevention to more actively promote hand hygiene as an important way to prevent the spread of infection. The outbreak of swine flu in 2009 and the COVID-19 pandemic in 2020 led to increased awareness in many countries of the importance of washing hands with soap to protect oneself from such infectious diseases. For example, posters with "correct hand washing techniques" were hung up next to hand washing sinks in public toilets and in the toilets of office buildings and airports in Germany. Research indicates that the COVID pandemic shifted social norms regarding hand washing, making it more prevalent worldwide.

== Society and culture ==
=== Moral aspects ===
The phrase "washing one's hands of" something, means declaring one's unwillingness to take responsibility for the thing or share complicity in it. It originates from the bible passage in Matthew where Pontius Pilate washed his hands of the decision to crucify Jesus Christ, but has become a phrase with a much wider usage in some English communities.

In Shakespeare's Macbeth, Lady Macbeth begins to compulsively wash her hands in an attempt to cleanse an imagined stain, representing her guilty conscience regarding crimes she had committed and induced her husband to commit.

== See also ==
- Antibiotic resistance
- Didier Pittet, an infectious diseases expert
- Food safety
- Bactericide
- Global Handwashing Day
- Nosocomial infection
- Occupational biosafety
- Public health
- Patient safety
- Rubbing alcohol
- Virucide
