= Koko (millet porridge) =

Ghanaian spicy millet porridge

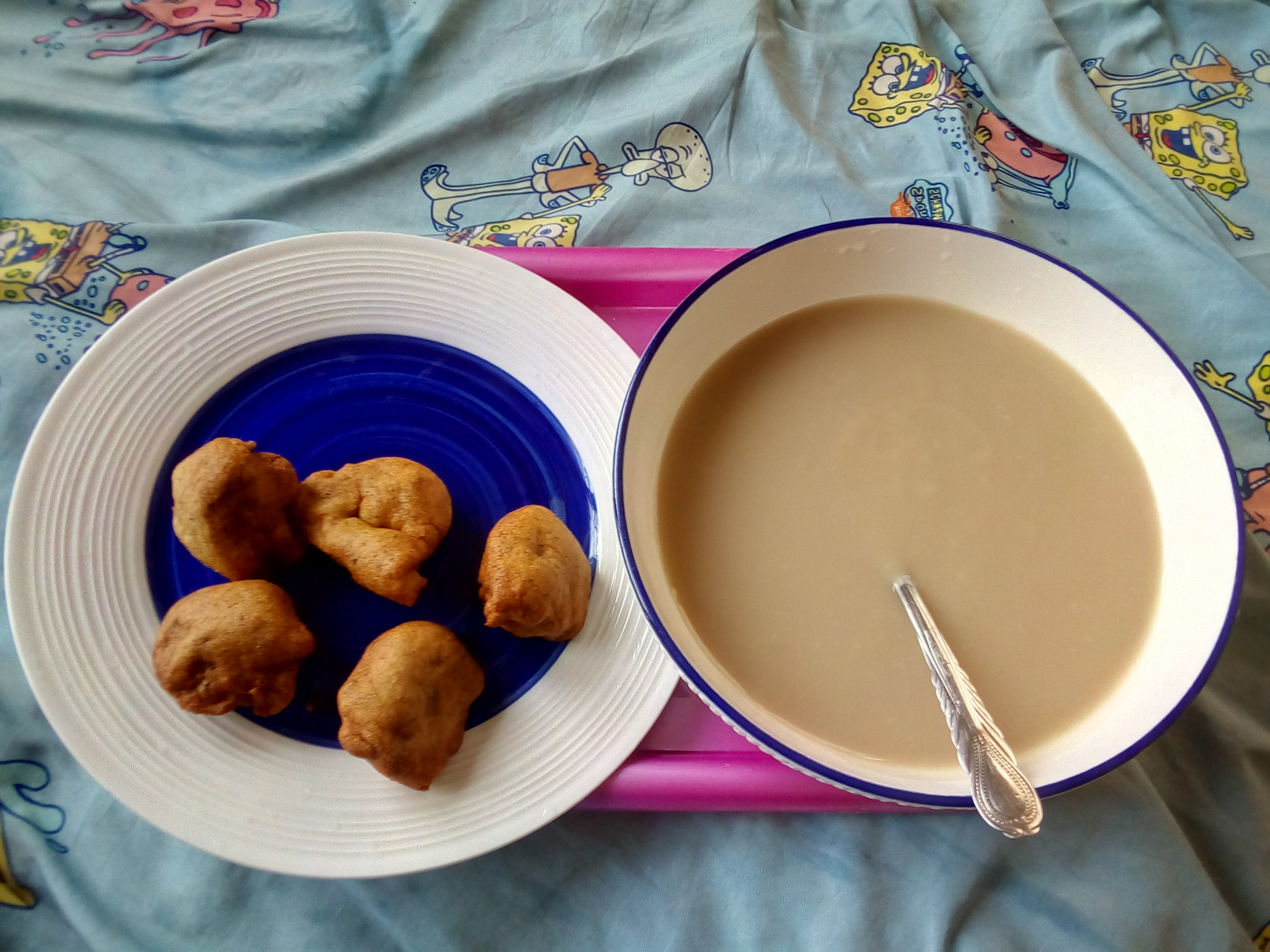
Hausa koko with koose

Koko (also ogi in Yoruba) is a spicy millet porridge. It is a popular Nigerian Ghanaian Togolese street food and commonly consumed as a breakfast meal. It can also be eaten in the late afternoon as snack. Koko is made from many grains including millet with a few local spices added to give it a particular taste and color. It is called Hausa koko in areas where it was introduced by Hausa-speaking people. In northern Ghana, the term 'Hausa koko' is not used. Instead, porridge made from millet is called 'za koko' in Dagbanli. Several types of porridge are made from corn, millet, and sorghum. Other types of porridge include koko talli/salli and zimbuli, among others. It is common in various communities in both countries.

It is usually accompanied by a fried bean bun called koose, pinkaso, a spicy fried flour dumpling, kuli-kuli, or the Nigerian bean cake called akara, which the former is created from.

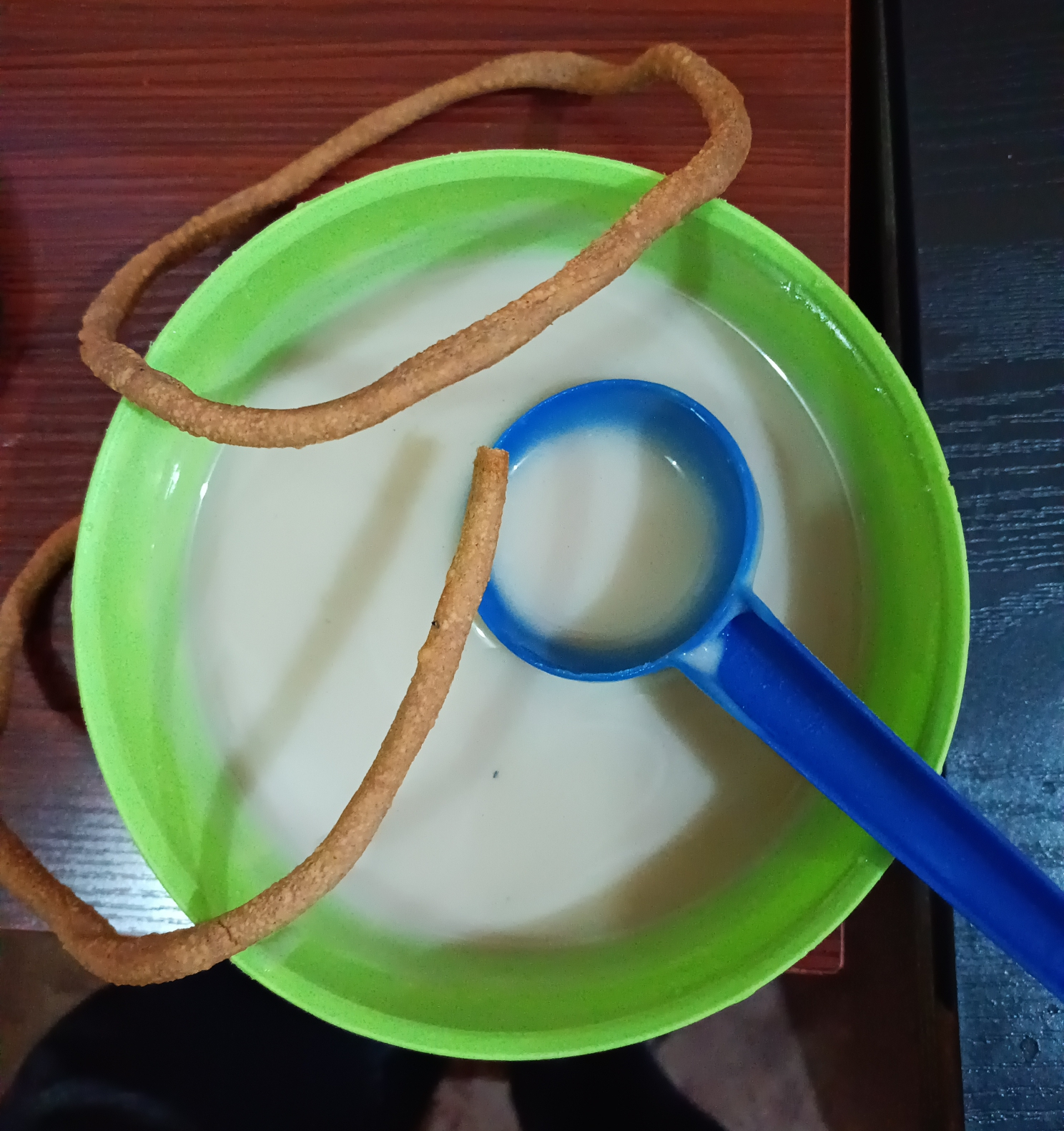
Porridge and kuli-kuli in northern Ghana

== Overview ==
Hausa koko is mostly found in West African countries and is credited to the several ethnic groups, it is believed to have been first made by various peoples among whom millet is a dietary staple. It is a common Ghanaian street food. On most mornings, it is sold on street corners. Sugar, milk and groundnuts are sometimes added for taste.

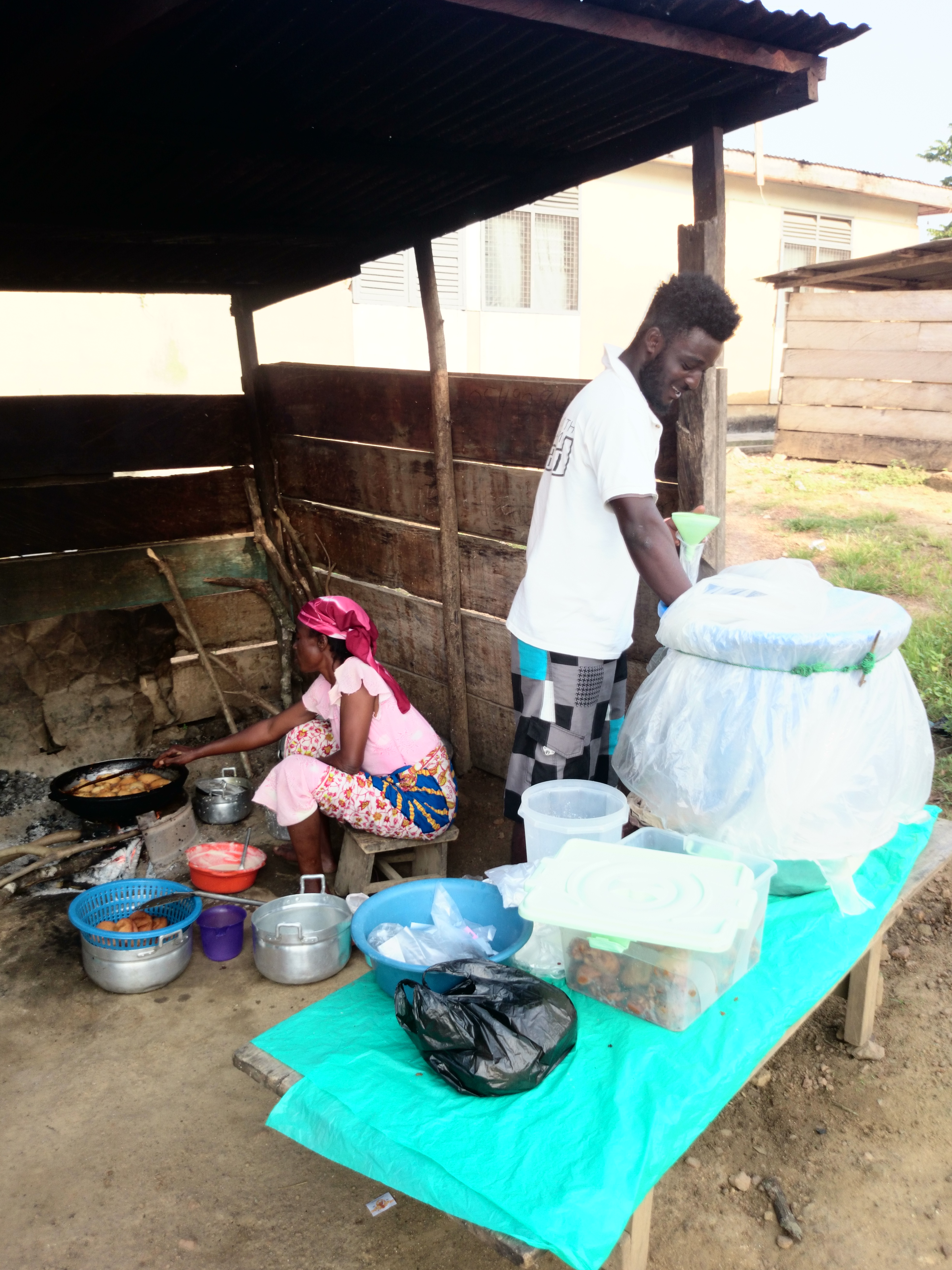
Hausa koko seller

== Nutrients ==
Koko is made from millet, which contains magnesium, manganese, tryptophan, calcium, fibre, and B vitamins.

== Ingredients ==
- Millet (jéró)
- Ginger
- Cloves
- Ground dried pepper
- Black peppercorn
- Salt
- Pepper
