= Goalkeepers (Gates Foundation) =

Initiative of the Bill and Melinda Gates Foundation for the SDGs

- Formation: 2017; 9 years ago
- Founder: Bill Gates, Melinda Gates
- Headquarters: Seattle, Washington
- Location: Global
- Website: https://www.gatesfoundation.org/goalkeepers

Goalkeepers is an initiative launched by the Gates Foundation in 2017 to bring together leaders from around the world to accelerate progress toward achieving the Sustainable Development Goals (SDG). The initiative also provides reports and data flow charts over SDGs progress since 1990.

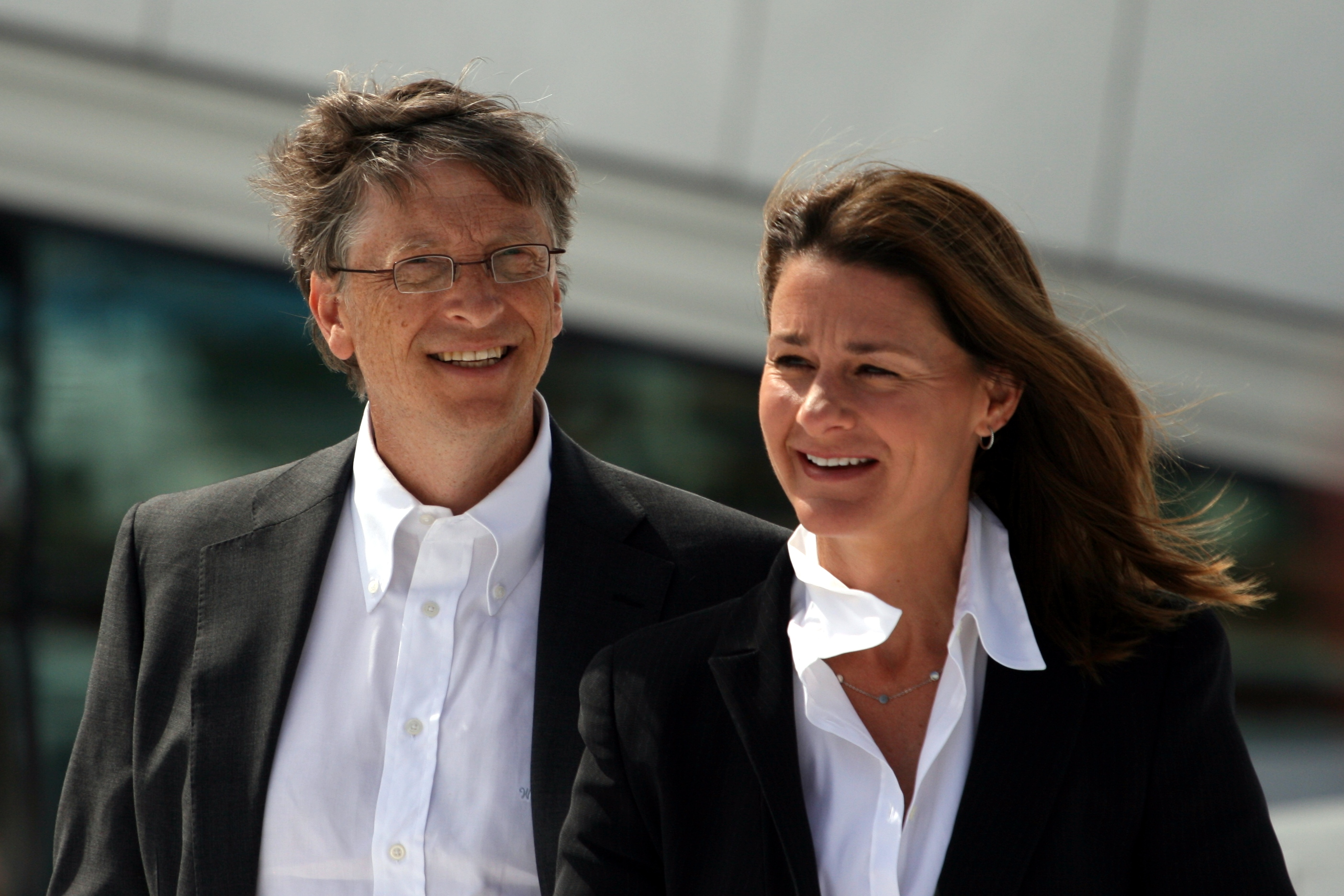
Bill and Melinda Gates, founders of the Gates Foundation

Its core event is the annual Goalkeepers Conference (which usually takes place during Global Goals Week and the UN General Assembly) at which the Changemaker Award is bestowed to 'extraordinary individuals who are driving progress in their communities and countries'. Invitations are issued to global leaders and aspiring personalities who have been personally selected by the board. Previous attendees include Barack Obama, Emmanuel Macron, Luiz Inácio Lula da Silva, Amina J. Mohammed, Erna Solberg, Malala Yousafzai, and Trevor Noah. Past award winners have included Yusra Mardini, Amika George, Ria Sharma, and Nadia Murad, who later went on to win the Nobel Peace Prize.

== Conferences and awards ==
=== 2025 ===
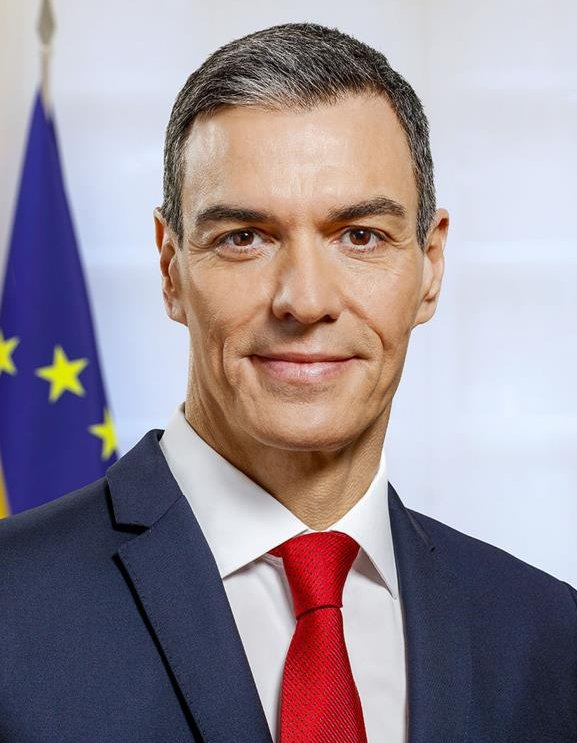
Winner of the 2025 Global Goalkeeper award Pedro Sánchez

The 2025 in-person Goalkeepers event was held in September at Jazz at Lincoln Center in New York City.

The winner of the Global Goalkeeper award was:

- Pedro Sánchez, Prime Minister of Spain

=== 2024 ===
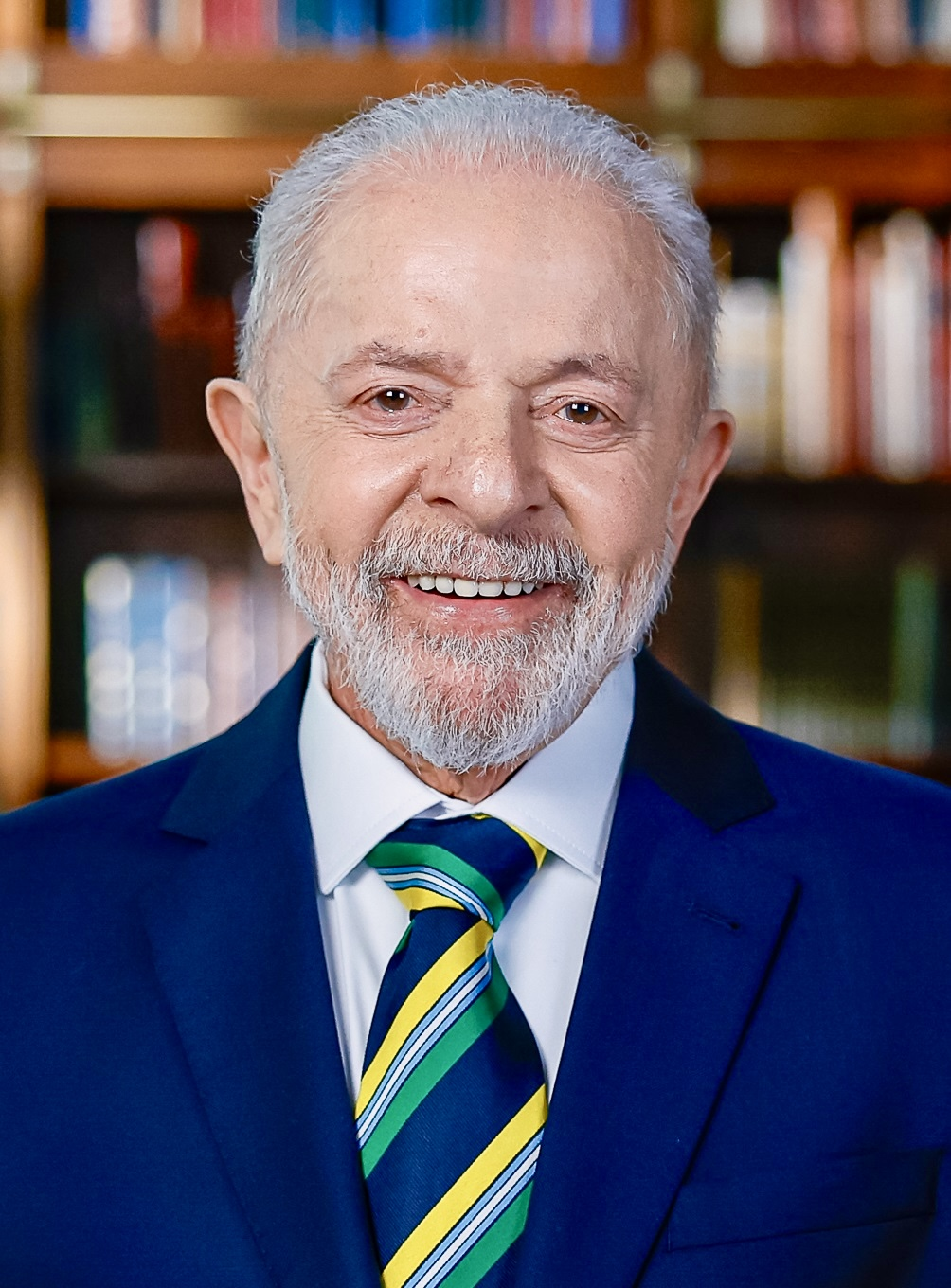
Winner of the 2024 Global Goalkeeper award Luiz Inácio Lula da Silva

The 2024 in-person Goalkeepers event was held in September at Jazz at Lincoln Center in New York City.

The winner of the Global Goalkeeper award was:

- Luiz Inácio Lula da Silva, President of Brazil

Further awards went to:

- Sabin Nsanzimana: Minister of Health of Rwanda
- Ratan Tata: Former chairman of Tata Group
- Tahmeed Ahmed: Scientist and physician with research focus on Gastroenterology, Public Health Nutrition, and Global Health
- Ladidi Kuluwa Bako-Aiyegbusi, Director/Head, Nutrition Department, Nigerian Ministry of Health and Social Welfare
- Beza Beshah Haile, executive director, HOPE-Spina Bifida and Hydrocephalus
- Lilian dos Santos Rahal, National Secretary for Food and Nutrition Security, Ministry of Social Development and Assistance, Family and Fight against Hunger, Brazil
- Bhavani Shankar, Professor of Food Systems, Nutrition and Sustainability, University of Sheffield
- Jemimah Njuki, Chief, Economic Empowerment at UN Women
- Zahra Hoodbhoy, Associate Professor, Pediatrics and Child Health, Aga Khan University, Pakistan
- Nancy Krebs, Professor of Pediatrics, Nutrition, University of Colorado School of Medicine

=== 2023 ===
The fifth in-person Goalkeepers event took place on September 19-20, 2023, in New York City during UNGA week. Featured speakers and performers included:

- Bosede Afolabi, Professor of Obstetrics and Gynecology, University of Lagos (Nigeria)
- Karlie Kloss, Founder of Kode With Klossy & entrepreneur
- Sallie Krawcheck, CEO and Co‑founder of Ellevest
- Lilly Singh, Entertainer, storyteller, and gender equality advocate
- Elaine Welteroth, Journalist & New York Times bestselling author
- Nuseir Yassin, Founder & CEO of Nas Company and Nas Studios

The awards went to:

- Fumio Kishida: Global Goalkeeper Award
- The Farmlink Project: Campaign Award
- Ashu Martha Agbornyenty: Changemaker Award
- Eden Tadesse: Progress Award
- Jimmy and Rosalynn Carter: Lifetime Achievement Award
- Bono: Voice Award

=== 2022 ===
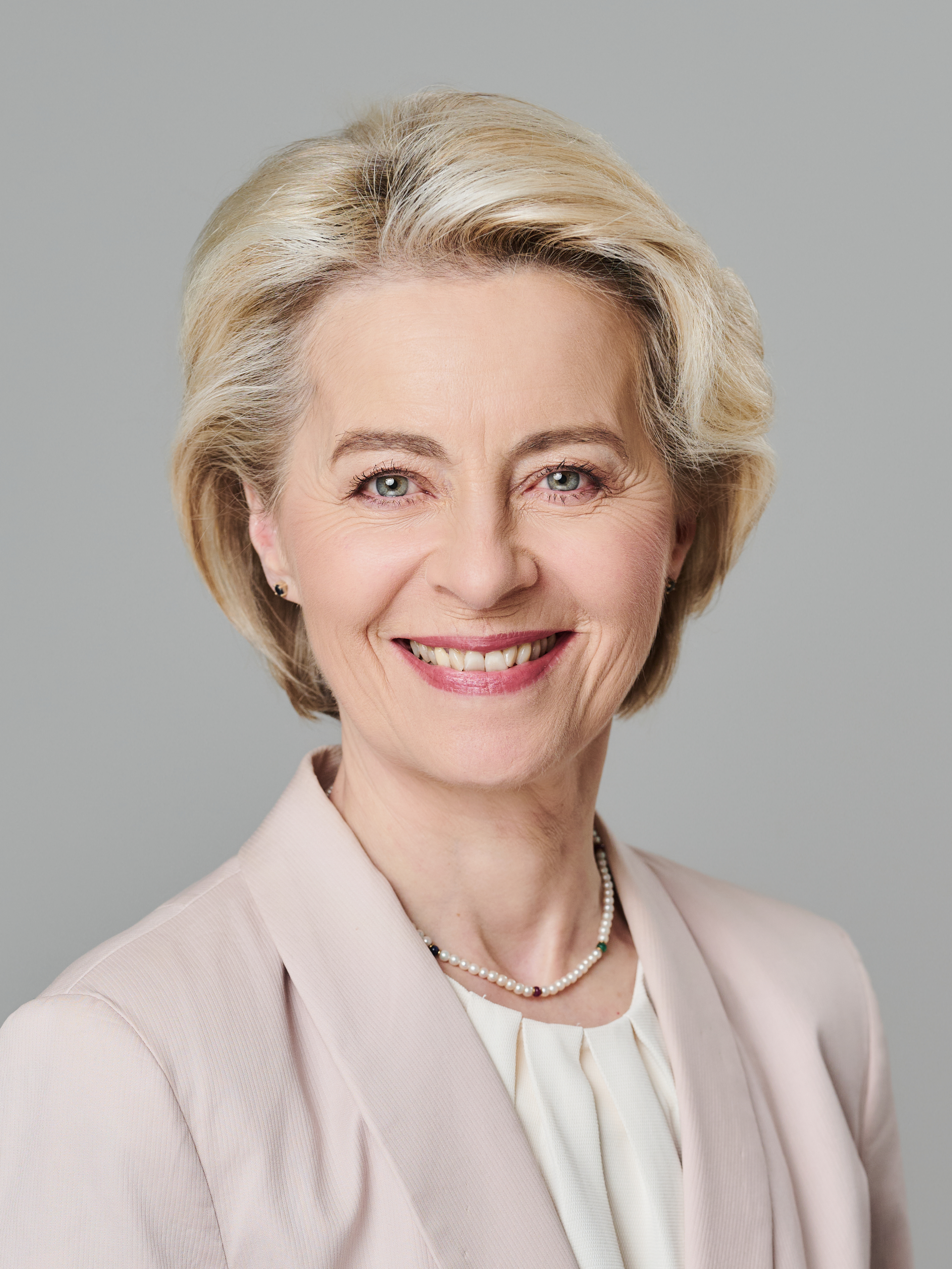
Winner of the 2022 Global Goalkeeper award Ursula von der Leyen

The fourth in-person Goalkeepers event was held in September 2022 at Jazz at Lincoln Center in New York City. Speakers included:

- Mia Mottley, Prime Minister of Barbados

The winner of the Global Goalkeeper award was:

- Ursula von der Leyen

Further awards went to:

- Zahra Joya: Changemaker Award
- Vanessa Nakate: Campaign Award
- Radhika Batra: Progress Award

=== 2021 ===
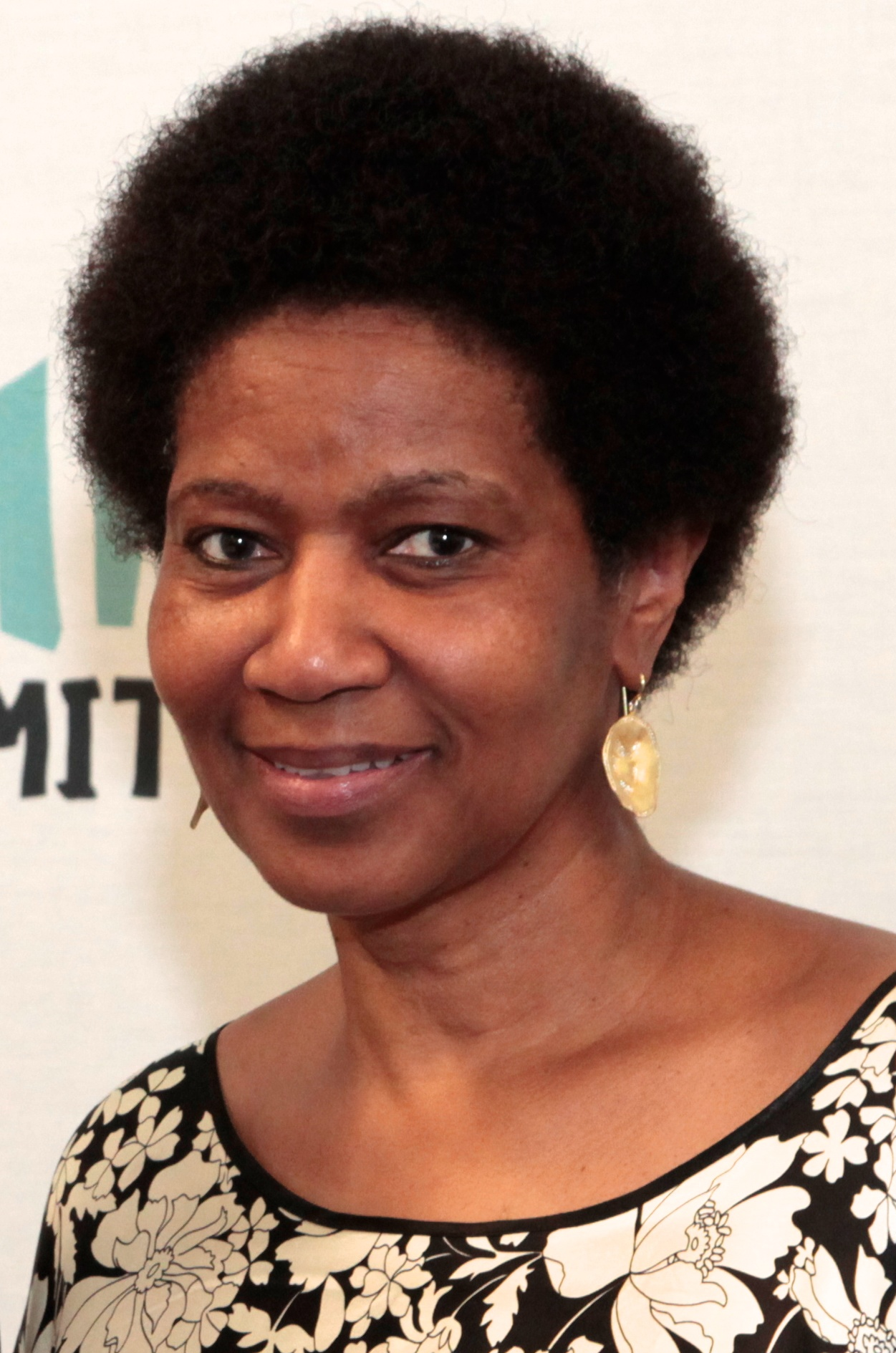
Winner of the 2022 Global Goalkeeper award Phumzile Mlambo-Ngcuka

The 2021 Goalkeepers conference could not take place physically, due to the COVID-19 pandemic, but had to be held virtually. The winner of the Global Goalkeeper award was:

- Phumzile Mlambo-Ngcuka

Further awards went to:

- Jenifer Colpas: Changemaker Award
- Satta Sheriff: Campaign Award
- Fairooz Faizah: Progress Award

=== 2020 ===
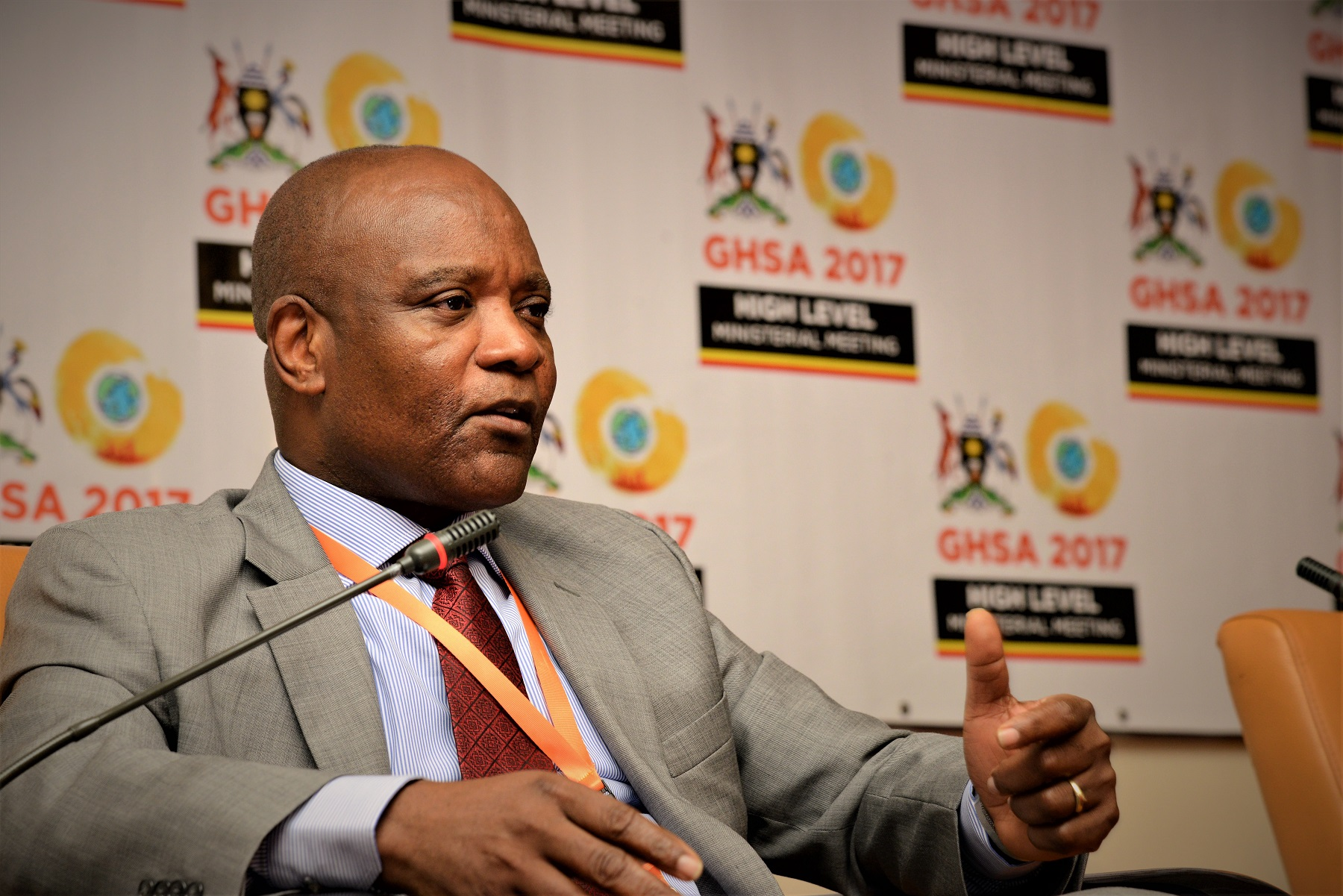
Winner of the 2020 Global Goalkeeper award John Nkengasong

The 2020 Goalkeepers conference could not take place physically, due to the COVID-19 pandemic, but had to be held virtually. The winner of the Global Goalkeeper award was:

- John Nkengasong, Director of the Africa Centres for Disease Control and Prevention for being a "relentless proponent of global collaboration and evidence-based public health practices, and a champion for minimizing the social and economic consequences of COVID-19 across the African continent"

The Global Goals awards went to:

- Bonita Sharma, co-founder and CEO of Social Changemakers and Innovators (SOCHAI) – a youth-led non-profit organization in Nepal
- Hauwa Ojeifo, founder of She Writes Woman, a women-led movement giving mental health a voice in Nigeria
- The MASH Project Foundation, a youth led social enterprise based in India that develops and implements support systems for people who work for social causes through partnerships.

=== 2019 ===
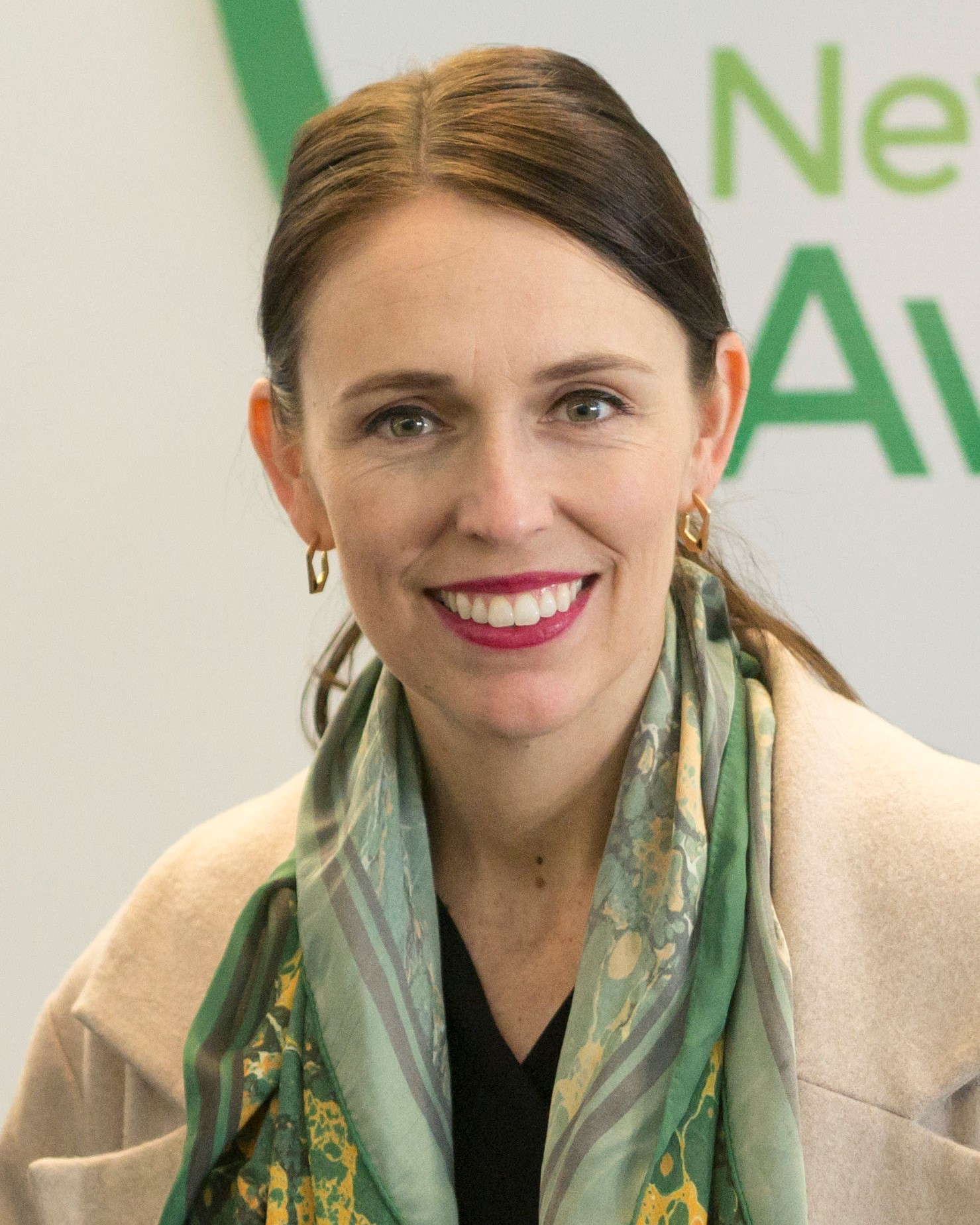
2019 Speaker, Prime Minister Jacinda Ardern

The third annual Goalkeepers event was held September 25–26, 2019, at Jazz at Lincoln Center in New York City. Speakers included:

- Jacinda Ardern, Prime Minister of New Zealand
- Pedro Sánchez, Prime Minister of Spain
- Jennifer Eberhardt
- Aliko Dangote
- Senjuti Saha

The Global Goalkeeper Award was given to:

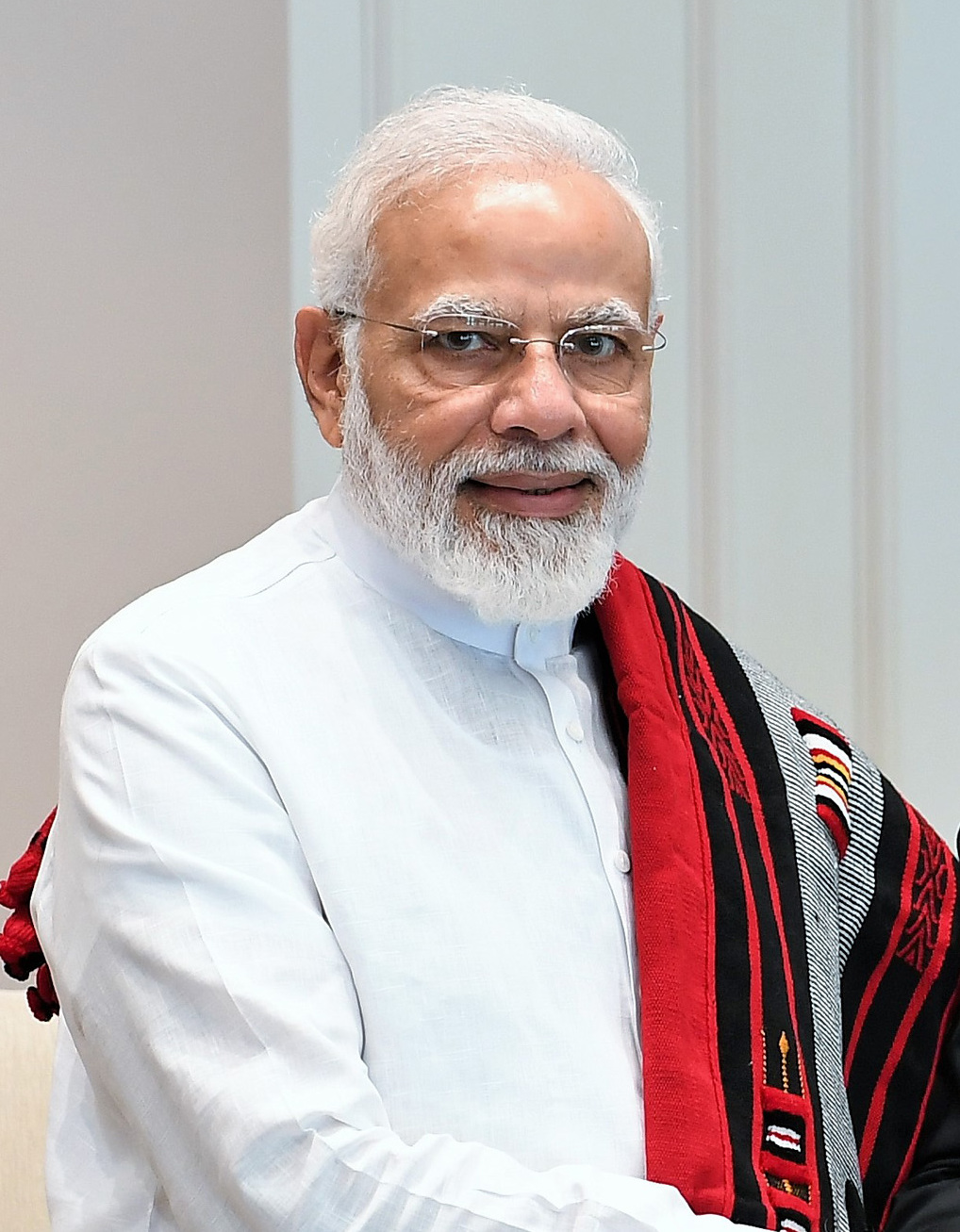
Prime Minister Modi got the Global Goalkeeper Award 2019

- Narendra Modi, Prime Minister of India, for successfully implementing the Swachh Bharat Mission, a cleanliness and sanitation project, including 110 million family and public toilets for poor and middle income families, reducing the Indian open defecation rate from 50% to almost 0% in 3 years. He personally makes cleaning initiatives - plogging along the roads and beaches - leading by example to promote mass fitness and cleanliness.

Ahead of the ceremony, human rights groups and three Nobel Peace Prize winners – Shirin Ebadi, Tawakkol Karman and Mairead Maguire – criticized in a letter to the Bill & Melinda Gates Foundation the decision to bestow an award upon Modi, stating that under his leadership, “India has descended into dangerous and deadly chaos that has consistently undermined human rights, democracy.’’

The Global Goals awards went to:

- Payal Jangid: Changemaker Award
- Aya Chebbi: Campaign Award
- Gregory Rockson: Progress Award

=== 2018 ===
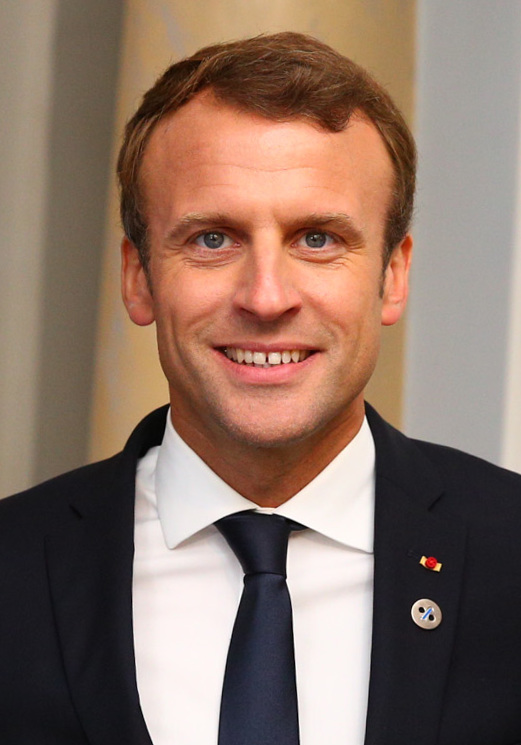
Main speaker of the 2018 conference: President Emmanuel Macron

The second annual Goalkeepers event was held September 25–26, 2018, in New York City. Speakers included:

- Emmanuel Macron, President of France
- Julius Maada, President of Sierra Leone
- Erna Solberg, Prime Minister of Norway
- King Kaka

The Global Goals awards went to:

- Nadia Murad: Changemaker Award
- Amika George: Campaign Award
- Cornelia Röper: Changemaker Award
- Natalie Robi Tingo: Changemaker Award
- Dysnus Kisilu: Progress Award

=== 2017 ===
The first annual Goalkeepers event was held September 25–26, 2017, at Jazz at Lincoln Center in New York City. Speakers included:

- Barack Obama, President of the United States
- Justin Trudeau, Prime Minister of Canada
- Queen Rania of Jordan
- will.i.am
- Malala
- Stephen Fry
- George The Poet

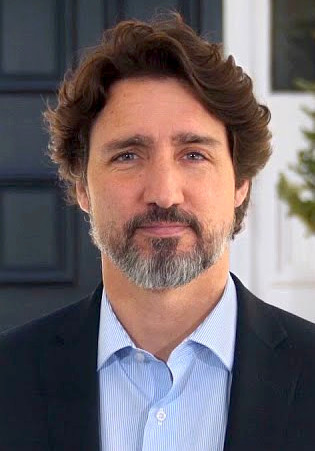

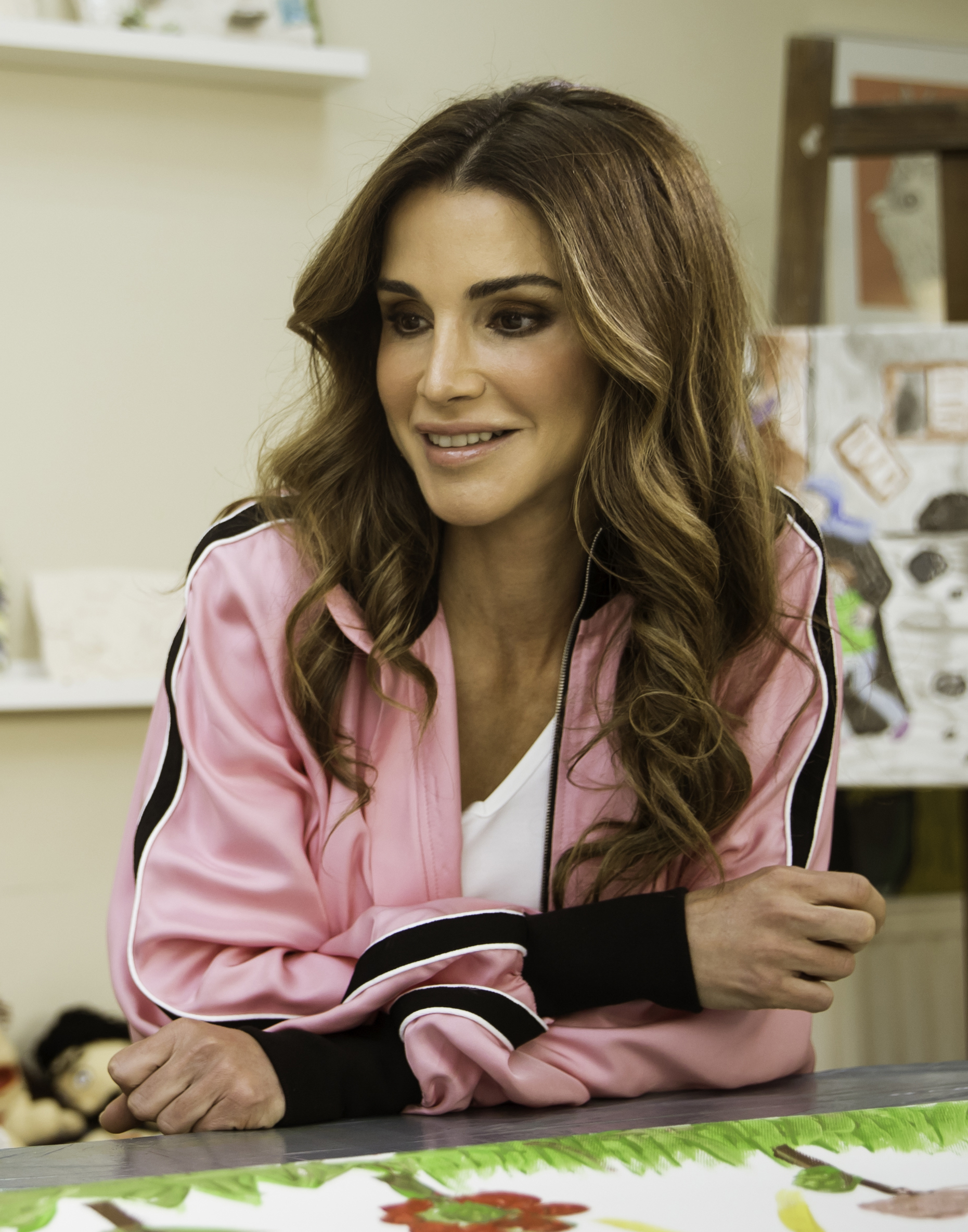

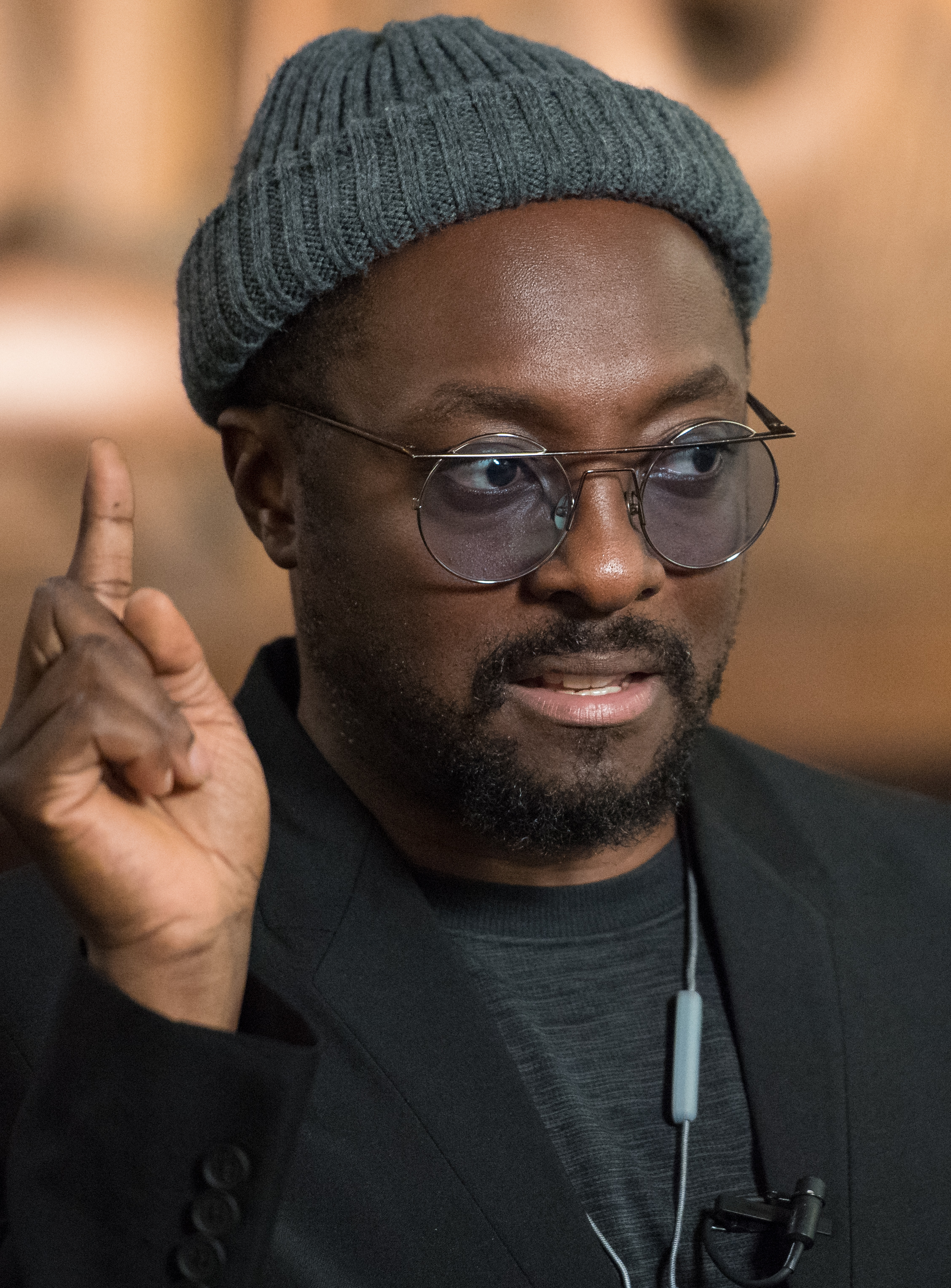

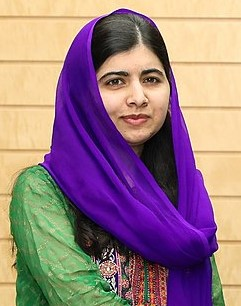

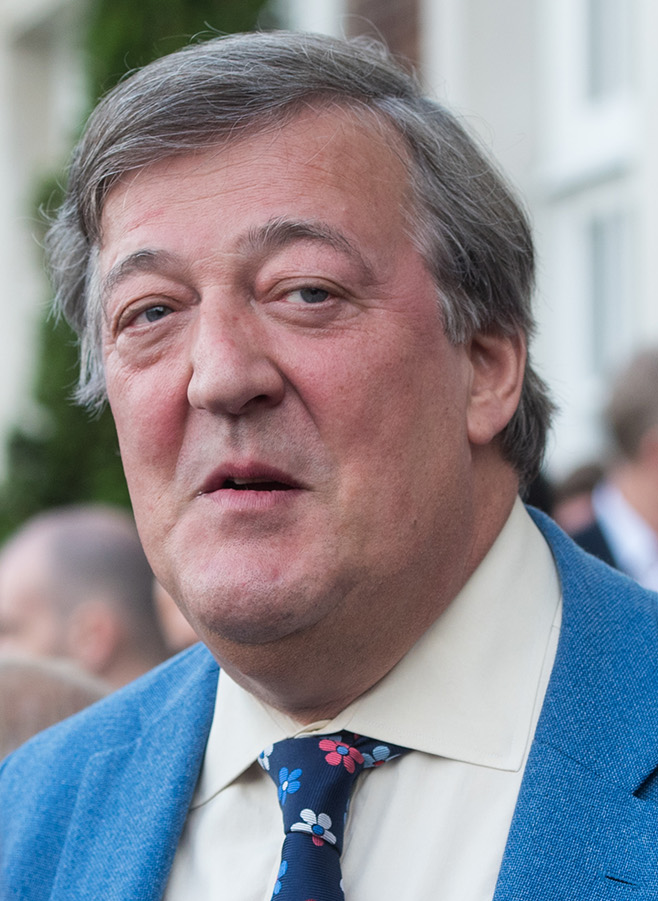

== Advisory board ==
The Goalkeepers program is being advised by several individuals, including the following:

- Hervé Berville (since 2022)
- Lukas Köhler (2019–2022)
- Prajakta Koli (since 2022)
- Tlaleng Mofokeng (since 2022)
