= Empower Ladies =

Togolese feminist movement

Empower Ladies is a Togolese feminist organization founded in 2019 in Lomé by Hamdiya Katchirika. The association is primarily dedicated to combating period poverty but is also involved in other initiatives, such as breast cancer prevention.

== History ==
=== Founding and actions ===
The association was founded in 2019 in Lomé by Hamdiya Katchirika. The organization is mainly dedicated to combating period poverty in the country. To achieve this, activists distribute reusable and washable cloth menstrual pads in remote areas of the country.

They also participate in awareness workshops, both on menstruation, in areas still heavily affected by related prejudices, and on other topics, such as raising awareness among young Togolese girls about breast cancer and ways to identify this disease.
