= Global Goals Week =

Event for awareness for Sustainable Development Goals

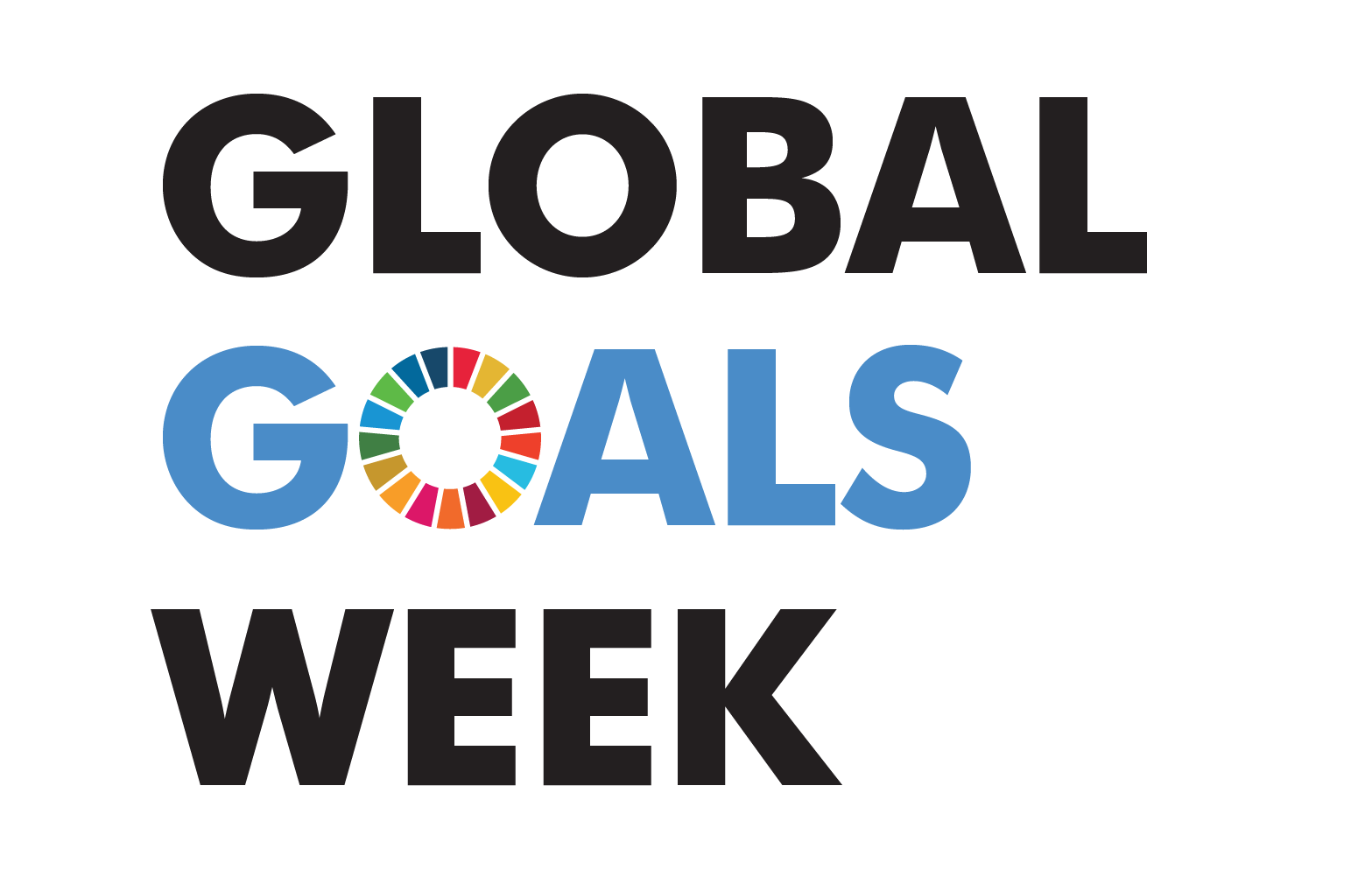
Global Goals Week Logo

Global Goals Week is a shared commitment between a coalition of over 160 partners across all industries, which mobilizes annually in September to bring together communities, demand urgency, and supercharge solutions for the Sustainable Development Goals (SDGs). It was founded in 2016 by the United Nations Foundation, Project Everyone, and the United Nations Development Programme (UNDP). It is timed to coincide with the UN General Assembly "High-Level Week" in New York. The week includes events, summits, conferences, forums, workshops, pledges, and other activations in New York, around the world, and online. It usually runs alongside Climate Week NYC, the annual conference of Goalkeepers (Gates Foundation), Bloomberg Global Business Forum and many other high-level events.

== History ==
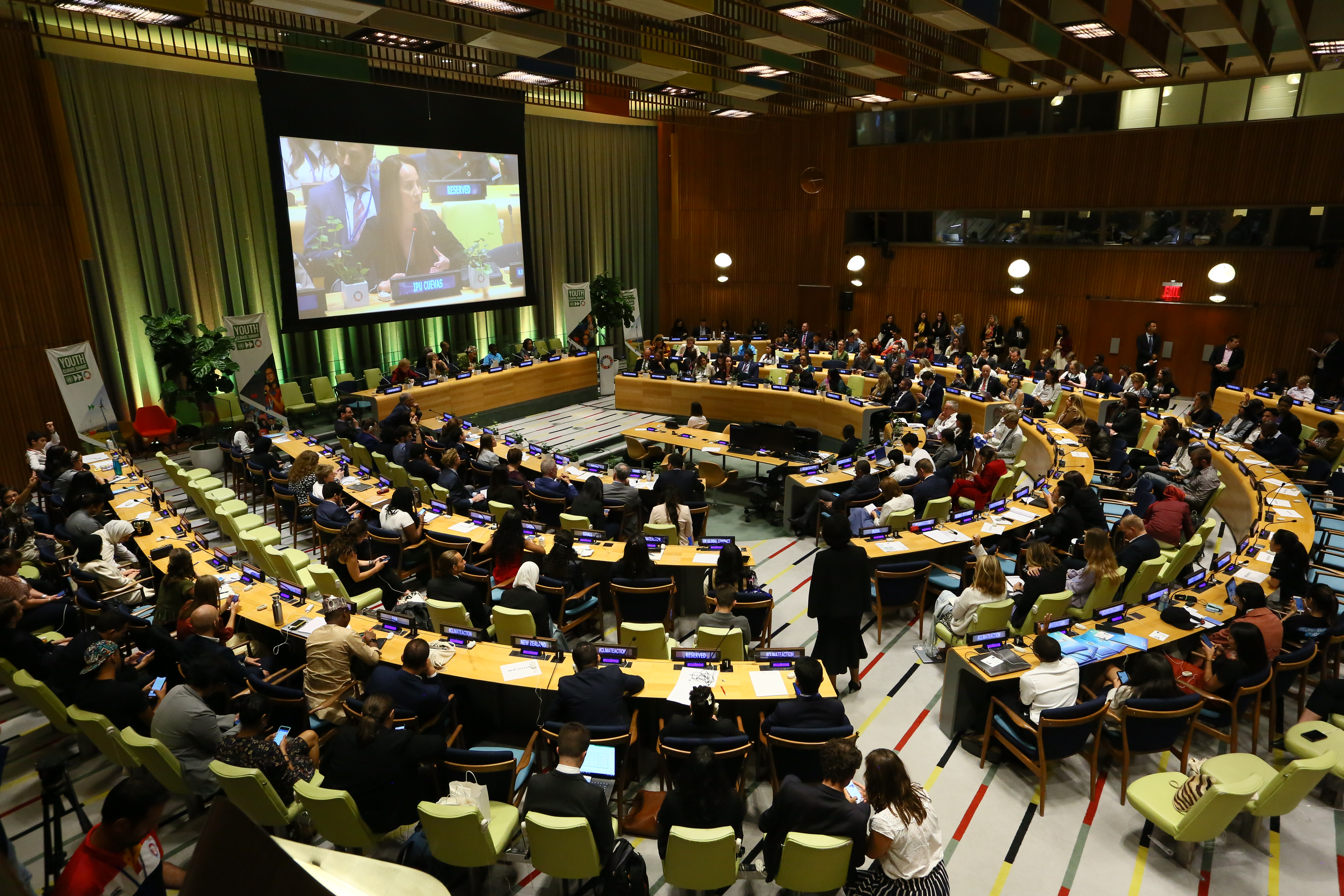
Young delegates at the UN Youth Climate Summit 2019

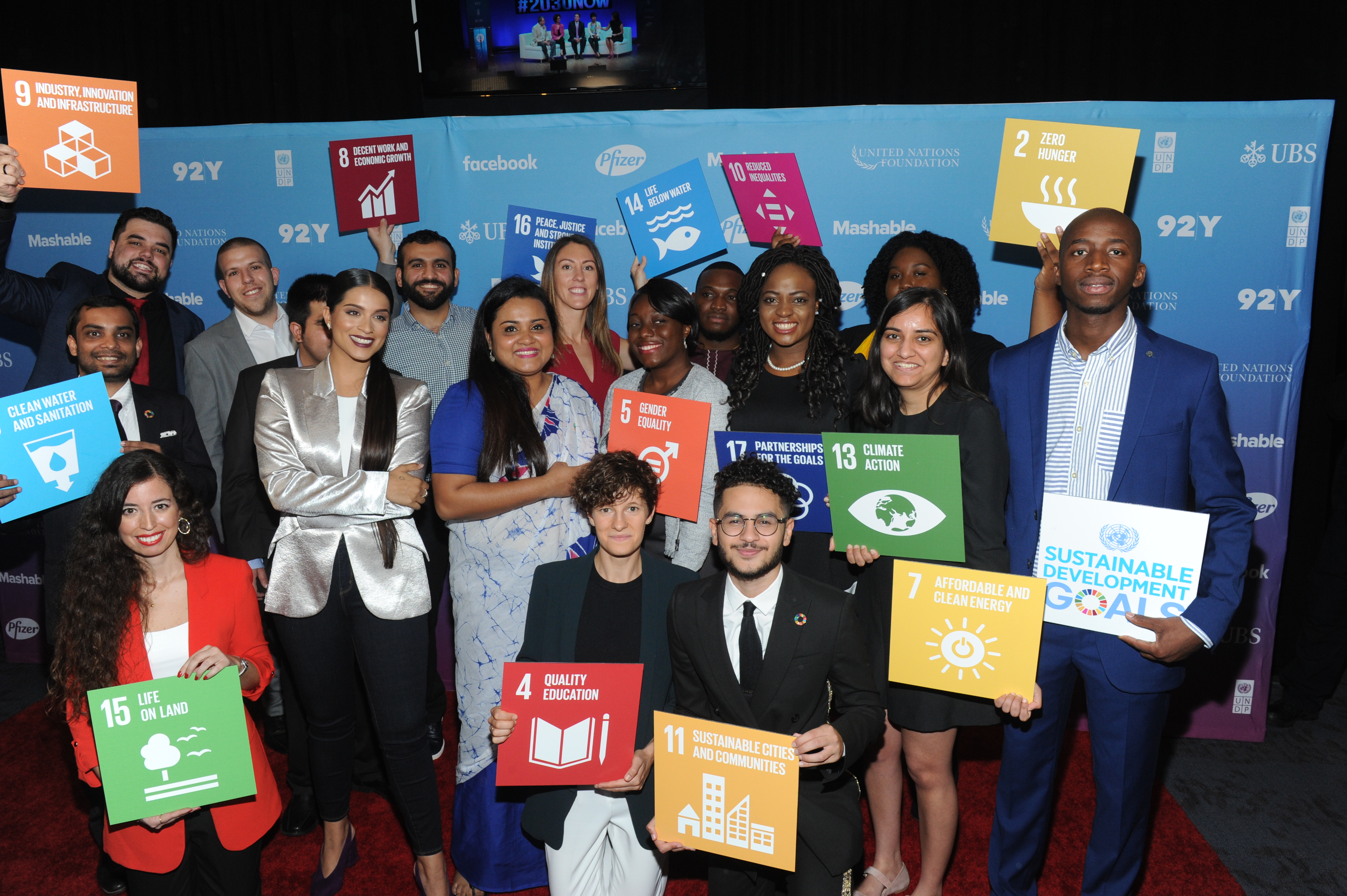
UN Youth Envoy Jayathma Wickramanayake, Lilly Singh, and young leaders

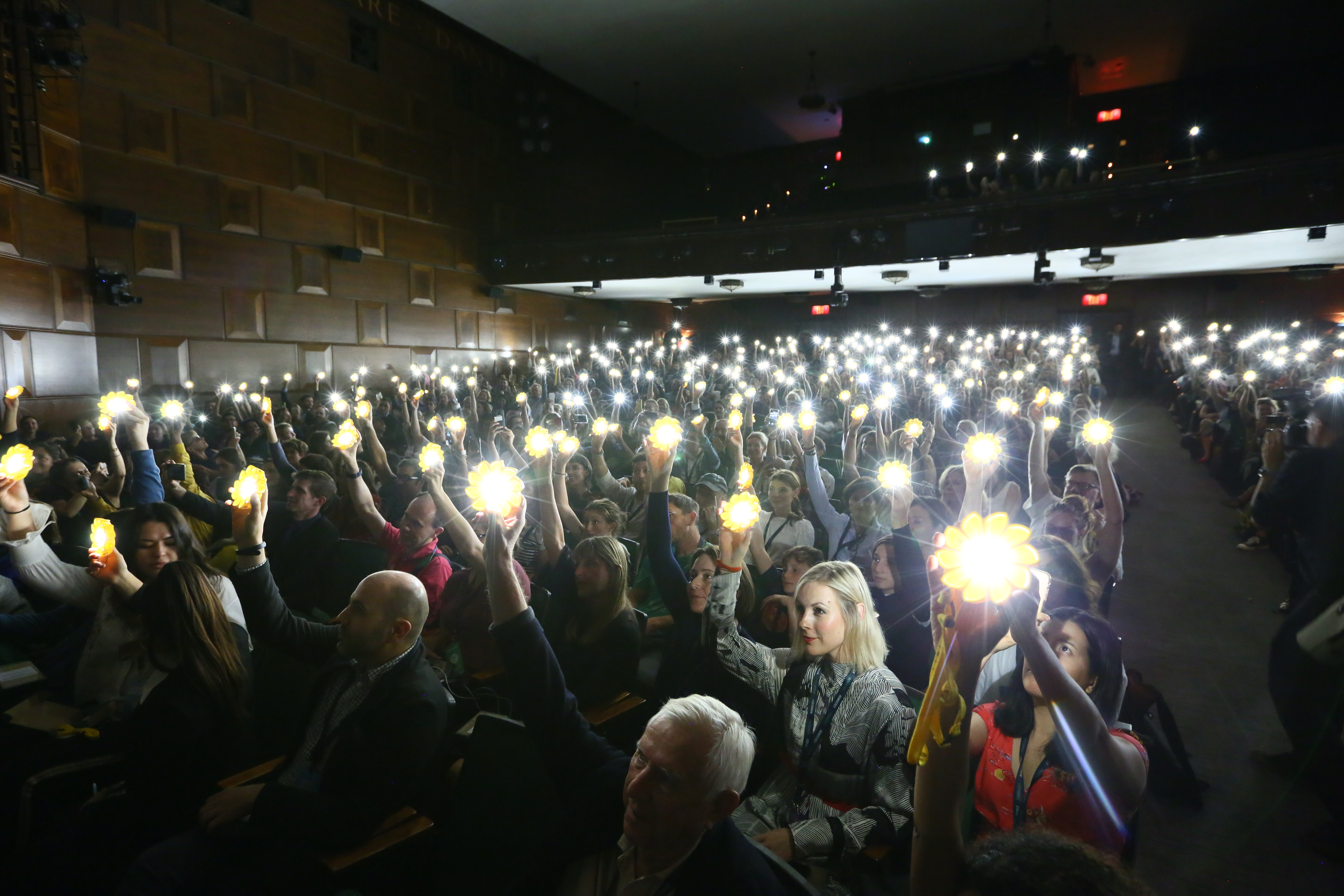
Social Good Summit 2019

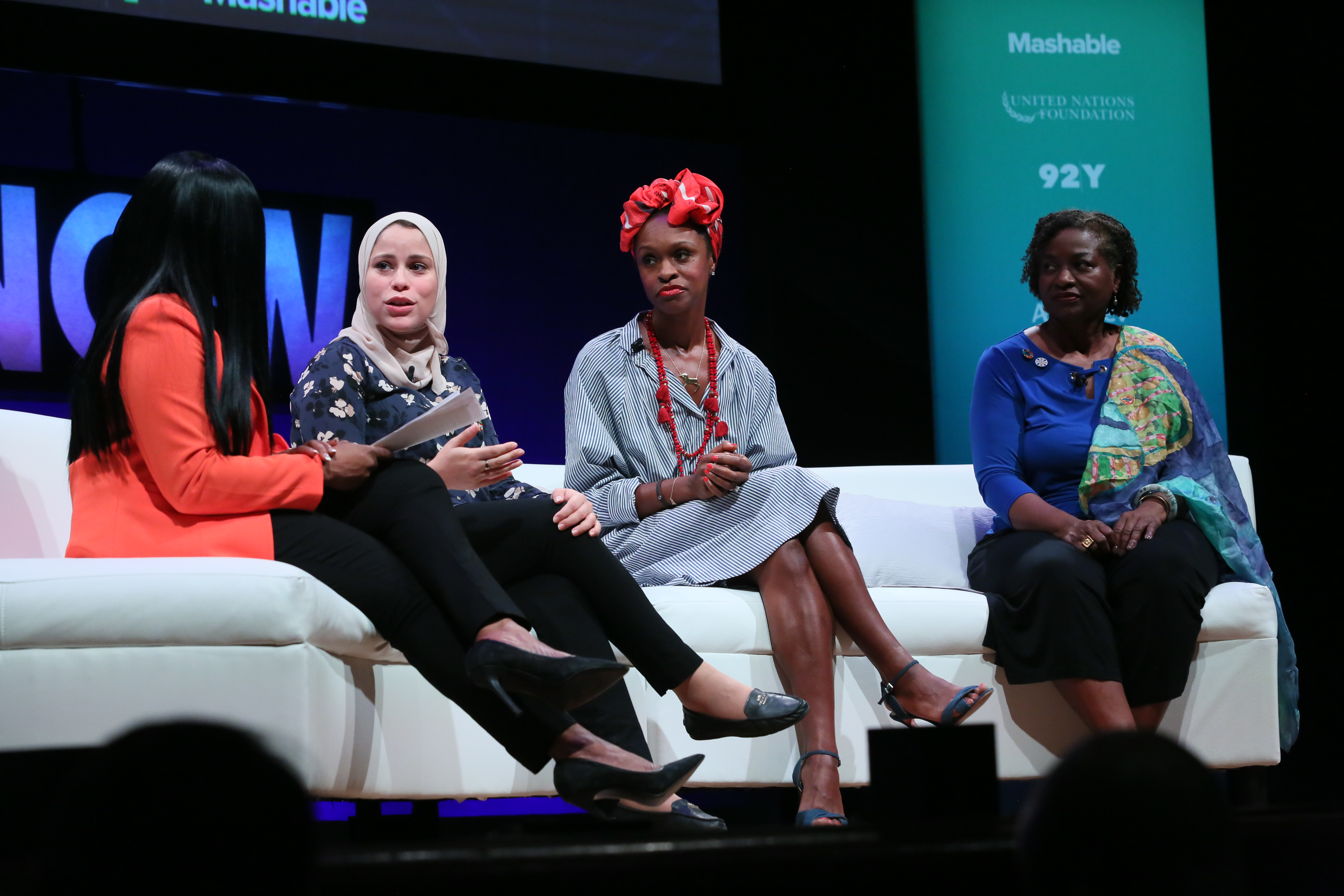
Female leaders at Social Good Summit 2019

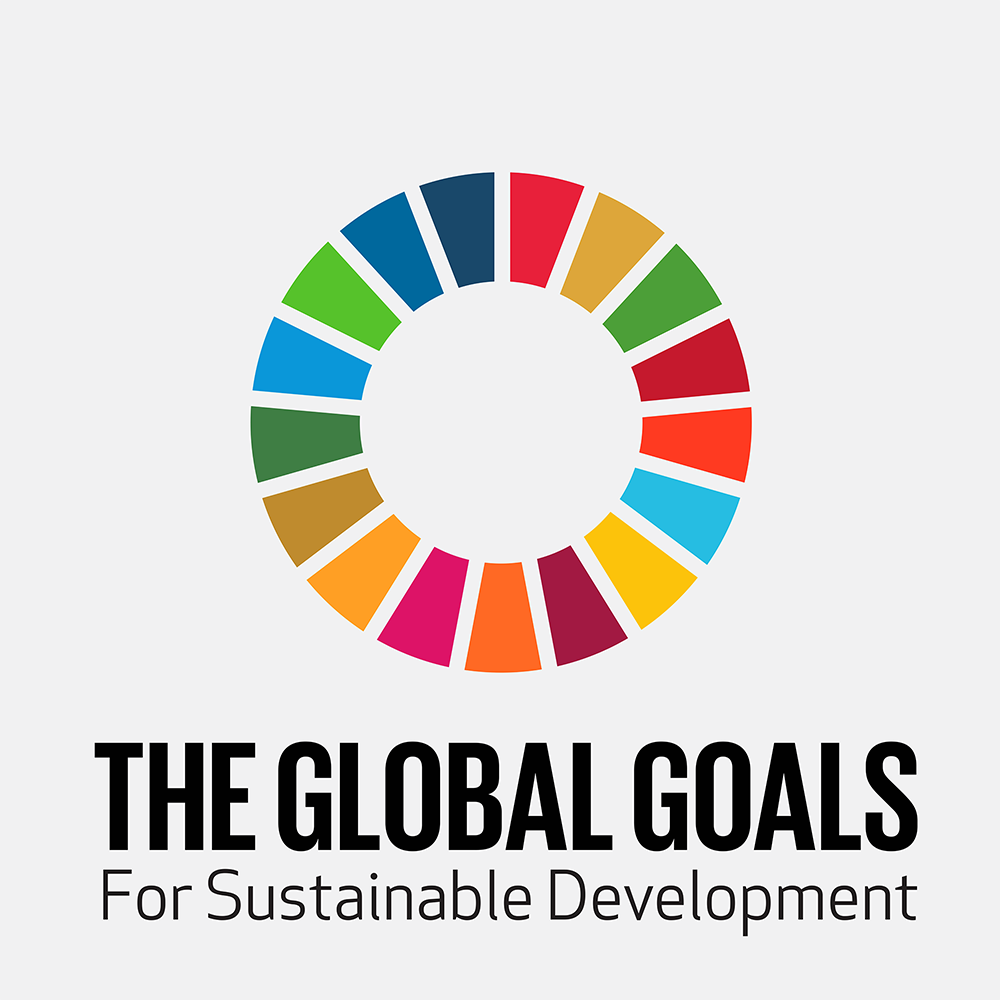
The Global Goals Icon

Global Goals Week is an annual week of action that first took place in 2016. It was piloted by core partners Project Everyone, the United Nations Development Programme (UNDP), and the United Nations Foundation. The core partners have now expanded to include the United Nations Department of Global Communications, the UN SDG Strategy Hub, the UN SDG Action Campaign, and Action for Sustainable Development.

== Structure ==
Global Goals Week is scheduled to coincide with the main annual meetings that take place during the UN General Assembly. The week highlights a shared commitment between over 160 partners across civil society, business, academia, and the UN system, to accelerate action on the SDGs, particularly during the UN General Assembly High-Level Week. Together, all this helps to reinforce the importance of working together to solve global challenges and achieve the SDGs.

== Purpose ==
The purpose is to organize "action, awareness, and accountability for the Sustainable Development Goals". It is also an opportunity to "speak out as one voice, share ideas and transformative solutions in the fight to build back better from global challenges".

It aims to make "the SDG community come together".

== Themes and Activities ==
=== 2024 ===
Global Goals Week 2024 will take place from September 20 to 29.

=== 2023 ===
Global Goals Week 2023 took place from September 15 to 24. To allow partners more flexibility, the calendar was expanded to host events from September 1 to October 15.

World leaders gathered in New York for the opening of the 78th session of the General Assembly (UNGA 78) under the theme, “Rebuilding trust and reigniting global solidarity: Accelerating action on the 2030 Agenda and its Sustainable Development Goals towards peace, prosperity, progress and the sustainability for all.” The first day of the high-level General Debate was September 19. Heads of State and Government and ministers explored solutions to the intertwined global challenges to advance peace, security, and sustainable development.

Heads of State and Government also gathered at UN Headquarters in New York on September 18-19 for the 2023 SDG Summit to review the implementation of the 2030 Agenda and its 17 Sustainable Development Goals (SDGs) and provide high-level political guidance on transformative and accelerated actions leading up to the target year of 2030 for achieving the Goals.

=== 2022 ===
Global Goals Week 2022 took place from September 16 to 25. To allow partners more flexibility, the calendar was expanded to host events from September 1 to October 15.

The seventy-seventh session of the General Assembly opened on 13 September under the theme, "A watershed moment: transformative solutions to interlocking challenges." The theme stems from the recognition that the world is at a critical moment in the history of the United Nations due to complex and interconnected crises, including the COVID-19 pandemic, the Russian invasion of Ukraine, humanitarian challenges of unprecedented nature, a tipping point in climate change as well as growing concerns about threats to the global economy.

=== 2021 ===
Global Goals Week 2021 took place from September 17 to 26. Due to the COVID-19 pandemic, the calendar was expanded to host events from September 1 to October 15. Events and activations in 2021 were mostly virtual, but also included some in-person events around the world, as well as hybrid ones.

Under the theme 'Building Resilience through Hope', and against the background of the COVID pandemic and global insecurity, the 2021 UN General Assembly's opening underscored the need for greater urgency and ambition to end the pandemic and ensure an equitable and green recovery and accelerated implementation of the SDGs.

=== 2020 ===
Global Goals Week 2020 took place from September 18 to 26. It was completely virtual due to the COVID-19 pandemic. The goal was to "cultivate ideas, identify solutions, and build partnerships with the power to solve a wide range of complex global problems from inequality to climate change".

=== 2019 ===
Global Goals Week 2019 took place concurrently with Climate Week NYC 2019, from September 21 to 28. The theme was: "Action for People and Planet". There were 72 Global Goals Week events, 68 events from the SDG Action Zone, 351 events from Climate Week NYC, and 2981 actions, including events, from the SDG Action Campaign. Around 107,000 people attended online and around 30,000 people attended in-person.

The week included the events of the UN Summits Week, comprising the UN-Secretary-General's Climate Action Summit, a High-level Meeting on Universal Health Coverage; the SDG Summit; the 2019 High-level Dialogue on Financing for Development (FfD); and a High-level Review of Progress on SAMOA Pathway.

Other events included:

- Youth Climate Summit
- Social Good Summit
- Global Week to Act for SDGs
- Private Sector Forum
- International Conference on Sustainable Development (ICSD)
- Sustainable Development Impact Summit
- Equator Prize 2019 Award Ceremony
- Bloomberg Global Business Forum
- SDG Business Forum
- UN Solutions Summit
- AI (artificial intelligence) Sustainable Development Summit.

A range of commitments were announced in 2019. These include financial commitments, partnerships, initiatives and activists.

Initiatives included:

- The Rutgers Institute for Corporate Social Innovation supported the launch of the University Global Compact.
- WFP and Alibaba Group unveiled "Hunger Map Live", a digital map to track food-security issues across the globe.
- Open Government Partnership's Acceleration Action on its recently launched coalition on justice.
- Google presented innovations in AI to advance the Global Goals and highlighted the work from their Impact Challenge grantees.

Activist events included:

- Activists and leaders from across all sectors came together at the SDG Action Zone alongside UN Deputy Secretary-General Amina J. Mohammed to pledge their commitment to a super year of activism in 2020, to kickstart a Decade of Action for the SDGs.
- Trisha Shetty (SheSays) focused on empowering women and girls, ensuring no-one is left behind.
- Kennedy Odede (SHOFCO and World Poverty Forum) focused on tackling poverty and reducing inequality, looking ahead to the World Poverty Forum in January, to be held in Kibera, Kenya's biggest slum.
- Kumi Naidoo (Amnesty International) focused on grassroots civil activists whose lives are at risk worldwide.
- Nikolaj Coster-Waldau (actor and UNDP Goodwill Ambassador) focused on the power of stories to galvanize movements for change.
- SDG Advocates Alaa Murabit and Richard Curtis called on all sectors and citizens to mobilize in 2020 for the super year of activism ahead.

Examples of financial commitments:

- UNICEF and the Islamic Development Bank (IsDB) launched an innovative fund that will open new opportunities for Muslim philanthropy to reach the millions of children currently in need of humanitarian support and help achieve the SDGs.
- Mastercard's Michael Froman and Global Fund Chairman Donald Kaberuka reported on Mastercard's new partnership with Step Up the Fight, a Global Fund initiative that proposes to raise $14 billion by 2023 for the fight against HIV, tuberculosis, and malaria. Of that $14 billion, the Global Fund is advocating for the private sector to mobilize at least $1 billion to expedite progress toward SDG 3 and universal health coverage.
- Colombian President Iván Duque and Howard G. Buffett discussed private capital and public policy levers that can support sustainable peace in Colombia, as well as how the Howard G. Buffett Foundation is elevating its investments in Colombia's agriculture industries in line with the country's peace process.

=== 2018 ===
In 2018, Global Goals Week took place from September 22 to 29. It was termed "the biggest Global Goals Week yet". Its theme was "Let's end poverty, fight inequality, and beat climate change".

Events included:

- Learning Revolutions: Creating Educational Environments for Empowerment and Inclusion
- Global People's Summit
- Social Good Summit
- UN Global Compact Leaders Summit
- World Economic Forum Sustainable Development Impact Summit
- SDG Philanthropy Platform Events
- 2018 Concordia Annual Summit
- Global Day of Action
- We the Future: Accelerating Sustainable Development Solutions 2018
- Bill and Melinda Gates Foundation Goalkeepers
- Sustainable Investment Forum North America
- Bloomberg Global Business Forum
- One Planet Summit
- International Conference on Sustainable Development
- The 8th Business Call to Action Annual Forum: Technological Disruption in the World of Inclusive Business

=== 2017 ===
Held from September 16 to 23, Global Goals Week 2017 events included:

- Hult Prize Awards Ceremony
- Social Good Summit
- SDG Media Zone
- Solutions Summit
- UN Private Sector Forum
- Global Citizen LIVE!
- Concordia Annual Summit
- World Economic Forum Sustainable Development Impact Summit
- International Conference on Sustainable Development
- Global Citizen Movement Makers
- Bill and Melinda Gates Foundation Goalkeepers
- TED Global NYC
- UN Global Compact Leaders Summit
- We the Future
- Global Citizen Festival

Climate Week took place at the same time.

Trends that emerged from the 2017 Global Goals Week included: "Development through the Trump prism, refugees and migration, humanitarian water-treading, putting business to work (for the SDGs), breaking down siloes, what's next for development and new partnerships, United Nations reform."

== Impacts ==
In 2020, Global Goals Week recorded the following impacts:

- 164 events registered, spanning September and October 2020
- 112 partners in the coalition
- 63 million people joined online
- 17.5 thousand people attended in-person
- 2.2 billion social media impressions
- Between September 18-26, 2020, Global Goals Week received 527,000 social media engagements
- The US, Japan, the UK and India were the top countries reached

For Global Goals Week 2019, the following impacts were reported in terms of social media metrics: Reach: 5.8 billion - defined as the total number of unique people who have seen the social media content. An analysis of Twitter data was done from 20 September to 2 October 2019 of over 50 different hashtags and Twitter handles. Around 10.8 million posts, shares, hashtags and mentions were tracked from 115 countries in 54 different languages.
