= Hamdiya Katchirika =

Togolese feminist activist

- Occupation: Journalist, activist

Hamdiya Katchirika is a Togolese journalist, feminist, and environmental activist. She is the president and founder of the Togolese feminist association Empower Ladies, which primarily fights against period poverty in Togo.

== Biography ==
During her childhood, she faced societal prejudices in Togo. For instance, when she had her period, her father refused to let her cook, even though they lived in Lomé, and she describes him as "open-minded". The activist graduated from high school in 2013. In 2019, she participated in the Data Forces Festival in Cotonou, where she presented a conference titled "Women, Data, science, and citizen participation". She was also chosen to represent Togo as part of the Mandela Washington Fellowship for Young African Leaders. This opportunity allowed her to study civic engagement at Rutgers University in New Jersey for a while.

She founded the Empower Ladies association in Lomé that same year. She is the president of this association, which primarily fights against period poverty in Togo. This is a significant issue in Togo, where prejudices on this topic persist; 28% of the girls surveyed stated that periods are "a woman's dirt, body waste, or an unpleasant smell". Her and her association's goal is to combat these prejudices.

Katchirika, for example, produces and distributes reusable or disposable cloth menstrual pads in remote regions of the country. With her association, she raises awareness among young Togolese girls on these topics through workshops, intervening both in villages and Togolese high schools. In these workshops, Katchirika also teaches breast self-examination to fight against breast cancer and enhance its prevention.

The activist is also committed to other issues, such as internet access in Togo and the inclusion of Togolese women in this process.
