= SheSays India =

Promoting gender equality and women's rights

SheSays India is an NGO based in Mumbai, India working to promote gender equality and further the rights of women. Its website is accessible in regional and foreign languages, to educate people on their rights, the laws and redressal mechanisms against gender-based violence. It is founded and led by Trisha Shetty, who is a lawyer and social activist.

== Work ==
The website provides relevant information on laws on sexual violence in India in a simplified language and format. It also provides step-by-step information on how to file a first information report (FIR), things to remember when going to a hospital, police station, lawyers and court proceedings. This information is also accessible in Hindi, Marathi and German.

The NGO has tied up with Global Citizen India to petition for sanitary napkins to be tax-free. The NGO also offers counselling support to survivors of sexual abuse and maps the closest police station, hospital and psychologist for immediate help for victims.

They further plan to have a directory of lawyers, gynaecologists and enrol case workers on the website to help survivors online.
