= Payal Jangid =

Indian activist

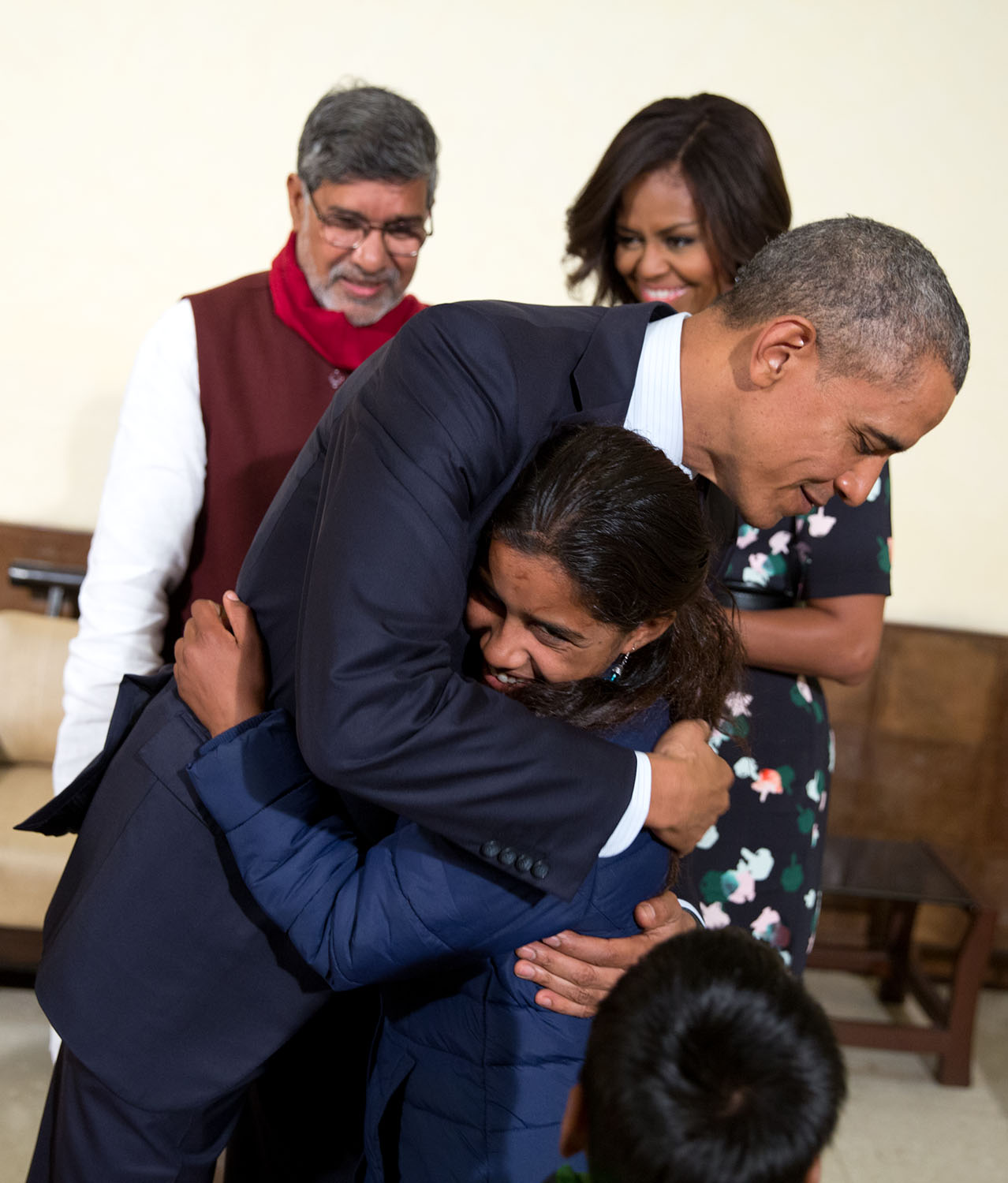
- Payal Jangid meeting Barack Obama in 2015
- Born: 2002 (age 23–24); Rajasthan's Alwar district, India
- Known for: children's rights activist

Payal Jangid is an Indian children's rights activist. She campaigns against child marriage, child labor and for the right to education for girls.

Jangid was born in Hinsla in Rajasthan's Alwar district, India. In 2012, Hinsla became a Bal Mitra Gram (child-friendly village), a concept forwarded by Kailash Satyarthi and his children's foundation since 2001; this provided inspiration to Jangid. When she was 11, she prevented her own child marriage and went on to prevent the child marriage of her sister as well with the help of Sumedha Kailash and her children's trust. She became the leader (Sarpanch/President) of the Bal Panchayat (children's parliament) in her area, consisting of children from a number of nearby villages. The Bal Panchayat takes up local issues and also coordinates with the Gram Panchayats. Following her first election she became a Deputy Sarpanch. She was told about various issues that the children faced,

They told us about child labour, child marriage and women in veils being dated customs. Then there were the issues we face in schools; lack of a toilet being the biggest issue for girls. This was a major reason why many girls wouldn't come to school, because they would have to go outside in the open. When we went to the panchayat and told them that there are no toilets in the girls' school, they felt ashamed that they haven't paid any attention to children's issues.

Her efforts have helped her village become child marriage free. In 2013 she was chosen as a jury member for the World's Children's Prize for the Rights of the Child in 2013.

US President Barack Obama and Michelle Obama met Jangid at the Siri Fort Auditorium in New Delhi in January 2015, with Nobel Peace Prize recipient Kailash Satyarthi.

In 2017, Reebok honoured her with its 'Young Achiever Award'. In 2019 she was awarded a Goalkeepers Changemaker Award, the youngest Changemaker awardee.
