= Bloomberg Global Business Forum =

The Bloomberg Global Business Forum is an annual event organized by Bloomberg Philanthropies, the charity founded by former New York City Mayor Michael Bloomberg. The event is held during the annual meeting of the United Nations General Assembly in each September in New York City as part of Global Goals Week - an annual week-long event for action, awareness, and accountability for the Sustainable Development Goals.

The conference represents a 'handoff' of the annual meeting of the Clinton Global Initiative, the last of which was held during the 2016 presidential campaign.

== Background ==
The first Bloomberg Global Business Forum (GBF) took place in New York in 2017. The event "was inspired" by an earlier Bloomberg Philanthropies event, the U.S.-Africa Business Forum which was held in 2014 and 2016 and was co-sponsored by the U.S. Department of Commerce and Bloomberg Philanthropies. That event brought business leaders together with heads of state from every African nation. At the 2016 U.S.-Africa Business Forum, then-president Barack Obama said "on so many key challenges that we face — our security, our prosperity, climate change, the struggle for human rights and human dignity, the reduction of conflict — Africa is essential to our progress. Africa's rise is not just important to Africa, it's important to the entire world."

The other precedent for the GBF is the annual meeting of the Clinton Global Initiative, a project of the Clinton Foundation. The CGI was held annually beginning in 2005 "as a way to try to implement meaningful solutions to world problems such as climate change, world hunger and poverty." In August 2016, former president Bill Clinton announced that the CGI scheduled for the following month would be the last one.

In the days before the first Global Business Forum in September 2017, Bloomberg adviser and key GBF organizer Kevin Sheekey linked the event to the Clinton Global Initiative, saying that Clinton "doesn't just happen to be the first speaker." Sheekey also said "There's a bit of a handoff" between the two events. In the global development industry, leaders also linked the Global Business Forum with CGI.

== 2017 Forum content ==
The GBF agenda addressed a range of global topics such as "mitigating climate change, eradicating disease and alleviating poverty." The agenda also featured discussions on addressing the disruption caused by automation and exploring new models for global business.

In an op-ed published on the day of the Global Business Forum, Mike Bloomberg highlighted the importance of the private sector in U.S. foreign policy, saying "it's important to remember that in a global economy, America's relationship with the world does not depend solely on the state of politics along Pennsylvania Avenue." Bloomberg argued that in a range of topics, "from public health and safety to broadband access to anti-poverty efforts," government should collaborate with business "because the private sector is often better at allocating resources productively, controlling costs, and using cutting-edge technology to solve problems."

During the Global Business Forum, leaders offered several major announcements. World Bank President Jim Kim and the Executive Secretary of the UN Framework Convention on Climate Change Patricia Espinosa announced a new joint platform to reduce the risk of climate investments called "Invest4Climate." Also at the forum, California Governor Edmund G. Brown Jr announced that Bloomberg, Espinosa and Indian business leader Anand Mahindra would co-chair his Global Climate Action Summit. Nigerian industrialist Aliko Dangote also announced an initiative to target one million Nigerian women for small grants using mobile banking.

Speakers at the 2017 Global Business Forum included former president Bill Clinton, Mike Bloomberg, Microsoft founder and Bill and Melinda Gates Foundation cofounder Bill Gates, Alibaba Group founder and executive chairman Jack Ma, Apple CEO Tim Cook, PepsiCo chairman and CEO Indra K. Nooyi and NBA superstar LeBron James. Heads of state and global organization speakers included French President Emmanuel Macron, IMF Managing Director Christine Lagarde, former Joint Chiefs chair Adm. Mike Mullen, Turkish President Recep Tayyip Erdogan, Canadian Prime Minister Justin Trudeau and World Bank Group president Jim Kim.

=== Relationships ===
In March 2018, speaking to the European Commission at the EU Sustainable Finance Day, French President Macron announced that he would be moving the next meeting of his One Planet Summit against climate change to New York to coordinate with the 2018 Global Business Forum, to be held September 26, 2018.
