= Satta Sheriff =

Liberian rights activist

- Born: 12 April 1998 (age 28); Fulmah District, Bong County
- Occupation: Child Right Activist
- Organisation(s): Action For Justice and Human Rights (AJHR)

Satta Fatumata Sheriff is a Liberian human rights activist, founder and executive director Action for Justice and Human Rights (AJHR) - an NGO working to demand access to justice and respect for human rights in Liberia. She's one of Africa's 100 Most Influential Young Persons, a young leader for the Sustainable Development Goals, United Nations and former speaker of the Liberian Children's Parliament.

== Biography ==
Satta was born April 12, 1998, during the Liberian Civil War in the mountainous Bong county, Fulmah District Bongmines; she started primary education at age six (6).

Satta's advocacy started at age (9) when a 13-year-old girl was due to marry a thirty-nine-year-old man in her community, Satta felt it was wrong; She soon engaged the girl's parents and the community leader, thus stopping the marriage. Since then, she has been working to demand access to Justice and Respect for Human Rights in Liberia.

== Advocacy ==
At age 13, Satta became a peer educator to create awareness on the effect of Stigma and discrimination on Children and adolescents affected by HIV/AIDS in Liberia. She led a team of adolescent girls under the banner “Daughters of the Kings” educating teenagers on sexual reproductive health, sexual exploitation and abuse, harassment, teenage pregnancy, child abuse, rape, the modes of transmission and preventive measures of HIV, STIs and STDs in Kakata City, Margibi County.

In early 2017, a 13-year-old was allegedly raped and impregnated by a lawmaker. Through Satta and others advocacy an investigation was conducted, the lawmaker was arrested and his case was sent to court. In 2016, Satta co-founded the Joint Action Committee on Children (JACC) to advocate and protect children rights in Liberia. Through JACC; Satta promoted a national Campaign to convict the killers of two Liberian minors (Alvin Moses & Ruben Paye) who were mysteriously killed in 2015. Since 2016, Satta has represented the Girls and Children of Liberia at the United Nations Headquarters in New York and the African Union Headquarters on different occasions to defend Children and Girls rights internationally.

In early 2016, Satta was awarded the Diana Princess of Wales Active Campaigner Award for defending the rights of children and ensuring safe spaces for girls and children in Liberia.

In 2015, Satta was elected as the first female Speaker of the Liberian Children's Parliament by children from across Liberia fifteen (15) political subdivisions. As the official voice of Liberian Children, Satta made recommendations on behalf of children and represented the children of Liberia locally, nationally and internationally.

In 2016, Satta was named the most influential teenager Award in Liberia for her advocacy and stands on national issues.

In 2015 during the Ebola crisis in Liberia, Satta initiated a radio program called "Kids and U" on Radio Joy Africa 97.5 MHz in Kakata City, Margibi County to promote the rights of children and to give children the space to talk about issues affecting them in society.

After Ebola, Satta also developed a project which eventually became a campaign titled "Your Support, Our Future" to solicit assorted school items for orphans especially students affected by the Ebola virus Disease.

== Honors ==
- Lillian Franklin Diversity Award: 2021
- 100 Most Influential Young Africans: 2020
- Most Prominent Youth Advocate of the year, Liberia: 2019
- One World Foundation Inc. Impacting Young Female Leader in Africa: 2017
- Most Influential Teenager and influential Child Rights Advocate: 2016
- Diana Princess of Wales international Awards: 2016
- Student Council Government, St Edward Catholic School, Monrovia Liberia most Outstanding Young Female Advocate: 2016
- Liberia Inter-High School Debate competition most Valuable Player (MVP) and one of the Most Eloquent Speakers: 2016
- Margibi County Journalist Association and the Redeem life Christian Church, Kakata City, Margibi County best Teen announcer: 2015
