= Amika George =

British activist (born 1999)

Amika George MBE
- Born: Amika Sara George; 4 October 1999 (age 27); London, UK
- Education: Cambridge University
- Occupation: Activist
- Years active: 2017-present

Amika Sara George MBE (born 4 October 1999) is a British activist who campaigns against period poverty in the United Kingdom.

== Life and activism ==
Amika Sara George was born in London to Indian Malayali parents from Pathanamthitta district, Kerala, India. Her father, Kishore, is from Kumplampoika. Her mother, Nisha, is from Kozhencherry. She was raised in Edgware in north-west London. She studied Indian colonial history and Britain's ties to the slave trade as part of her degree from Cambridge University.

George was inspired to take action after reading an article describing how many poor British women missed school due to stigma around menstruation and/or being unable to afford sanitary products such as tampons. She has said, "We need to make it very clear that we want to see equal access to education for all young people." At the age of 17 she started a popular petition addressed to Westminster (which gained over 200,000 signatories), and while still in secondary school she founded the #FreePeriods organisation in April 2017. As part of her campaigning she has organised protests aimed at convincing the UK government to provide free sanitary products to schoolchildren, featuring speakers such as Adwoa Aboah, Suki Waterhouse, Jess Phillips, and Daisy Lowe.

She has written for Vogue about the role of activism among young people, and also for The Guardian and The Telegraph about how the Scottish government's commitment to provide free sanitary products for poor students should be emulated in England. George has often commented on the lengths young people who menstruate go when they cannot afford pads or tampons, including using items of clothing, toilet roll, or using the same tampon many days in a row (putting them at risk of toxic shock syndrome). She additionally has remarked upon how education for men must be improved such that they can engage with tackling menstruation taboo and period poverty.

In March 2019 chancellor of the exchequer Philip Hammond announced that secondary schools in England would receive funding to provide sanitary products free-of-charge to poorer young people. George and fellow campaigners welcomed the statement, and said that it should go further by expanding to primary schools (as menstruation can start as early as age seven) and enshrining the commitment in law for future governments.

In response to her activism, George has been honoured on the Time Most Influential Teens of 2018 list, The Big Issue Top 100 Changemakers, and Teen Vogue 21 under 21 (after being nominated by Emma Watson for the latter). George won a Bill & Melinda Gates Foundation Goalkeepers Campaign Award in 2018, which she was presented with in a ceremony in New York City.

As of April 2019 George is studying History at Murray Edwards College, University of Cambridge, and was described by college master Dame Barbara Stocking as 'inspirational'.

George was appointed Member of the Order of the British Empire (MBE) in the 2021 Birthday Honours for services to education. At 21, she was the youngest recipient on the list. She said she initially felt "quite uncomfortable" about accepting her MBE. When considering the implications of the honour, she described the British Empire as "an horrific and exploitative endeavour". She said she decided to accept the award because young people of colour are underrepresented in politics and activism.
