= Trisha Shetty =

Indian gender equality activist (born 1990)

- Born: 16 September 1990 (age 36); Bombay (now Mumbai), Maharashtra, India
- Education: Jai Hind College (BA); University of Mumbai (LL.B.); Columbia University (Obama Scholar)
- Occupations: Lawyer, social activist
- Organizations: Founder and CEO, SheSays India; President, Steering Committee, Paris Peace Forum; Global Advisory Council, The Museum for the United Nations - UN Live; Global Advisory Board, UNLEASH; Health Commissioner, The Lancet-Chatham House Commission
- Awards: Vogue India Woman of the Year; Forbes 30 Under 30; Queen's Young Leader Award; UN Young Leader for the Sustainable Development Goal

Trisha Shetty (born 16 September 1990) is an Indian activist for gender equality and the founder of SheSays. She is known for human rights advocacy, especially advocating for gender-sensitive policies and law, quality education, youth and gender representation and preventing sexual violence in India. Her work and advocacy has been recognised by the United Nations, President Obama, Queen Elizabeth II and President Emmanuel Macron. She currently serves as the President of the Steering Committee of the Paris Peace Forum, an international summit launched in 2018, under the leadership of President Macron; to promote good global governance. She is also part of the 8 member Global Leadership Advisory Council of the Museum for the United Nations - UN Live, alongside Ban Ki-moon; Former UN Secretary-General and Darren Walker; President, Ford Foundation. Shetty was named one of India's "7 Most Powerful Warriors" by India Today and was one of the honourees of the Vogue India Woman of the Year Award. She was also inducted as one of the 12 Obama Foundation Scholars at Columbia University in the inaugural batch. Trisha publicly shared her story of child sexual abuse for the first time in 2019, in a TED Talk titled, "Embrace your scars, be your own hero" as part of a special edition of TED conference broadcast on Television, hosted by and in collaboration with the Actor, Shah Rukh Khan.

== Early life and education ==
Trisha Shetty was born in Mumbai, Maharashtra, India. She completed her bachelor's degree in Political Science and Psychology from Jai Hind College, University of Mumbai. She then graduated as a lawyer from the University of Mumbai. In 2018, she was selected as an Obama Foundation Scholar to complete a one-year specialised training, education, and mentorship program at Columbia University in New York City. The inaugural Obama Scholars cohort comprised twelve accomplished leaders participating in an immersive program combining academic, skills-based, and experiential learning, designed by Columbia University in consultation with the Obama Foundation.

== Career and activism ==
Shetty founded SheSays in August 2015. SheSays is a youth-led movement to advance gender equality through a multidimensional approach. Trisha shared her personal story of child sexual abuse and her journey to start SheSays for the first time in November 2019 through her TED talk, "Embrace your scars, be your own hero." Her talk was aired on television across Star Plus and Star World in English and Hindi. She spoke as part of a special series developed by TED in collaboration with the actor, Shah Rukh Khan and Star TV Network. The talk was translated in multiple regional Indian languages and was broadcast digitally via TED, Hotstar and NatGeo.

In 2016, the United Nations Secretary-General Ban Ki-moon and Secretary-General's Envoy on Youth announced Shetty as one of 17 youth leaders selected for the inaugural class of UN Youth Leaders for the Sustainable Development Goals. Shetty was selected for her leadership and contribution to end gender inequality and injustice by 2030.

In 2017, Shetty was named on the Forbes 30 Under 30 list under the categories Pioneer Women and Social Entrepreneur. She also delivered the keynote address at the UN ECOSOC Youth Forum, 2017.

In March 2018, Shetty was selected as one of the 13 Indian's to join the inaugural Young Leaders India-France Club launched by French President Emmanuel Macron, during his State visit to India. The Club Young Leaders India-France aims to build an influential advisory network to promote Indo-French bilateral action.

In June 2018, Shetty was inducted into the final Queen's Young Leader Cohort by Her Majesty Queen Elizabeth at Buckingham Palace. As a Queen's Young Leader, Shetty received specialised training and mentorship and was invited to a reception hosted by Prime Minister Theresa May at 10 Downing Street.

Shetty was also co-contributor to the Sunday Times best seller, Feminists Don't Wear Pink (2018), a collection of short stories by activists and female leaders to raise money for the United Nations initiative Girl Up.

On International Day of the Girl Child, Shetty assisted Michelle Obama to launch the Global Girls Alliance under the Obama Foundation. Shetty joined other celebrities including Zendaya, Karlie Kloss and Jennifer Hudson on Today and urged viewers to take a stand for marginalised girls.

In 2018, Shetty became the vice-president of the Paris Peace Forum Steering Committee and the following year she was named the President of the Steering Committee working with President Macron to host an annual event to support international cooperation and global governance to ensure durable peace.

In response to COVID-19, Shetty has joined the Lancet-Chatham House Commission as a Health Commissioner on Improving Population Health Post COVID.

In 2021, Shetty also joined the Global Advisory Board of UNLEASH alongside Mr. Nandan Nilekani, co-founder, Infosys and Ms Nena Stoilkovic, Under-Secretary General, International Federation of Red Cross and Red Crescent Societies. UNLEASH is a non-profit founded in 2016 with the aim of developing solutions to the SDGs and building capacity for young people from around the world.

In April 2022, Shetty joined former Prime Minister of Sweden, Mr. Stefan Löfven alongside Mr. Jan Eliasson, Former Deputy Secretary-General of the UN and Minister for Foreign Affairs, Sweden, Ms. Sharan Burrow, General Secretary, International Trade Union Confederation (ITUC), Australia and Anna Sundström, Secretary General, Olof Palme International Center to launch the Common Security 2022 report to mark the 40th anniversary of Olof Palme's Independent Commission on Disarmament and Security Issues. Shetty was part of the High-Level Advisory Commission that consulted on the drafting of the report.

In 2023, Trisha joined the ANDAM guest jury alongside model Gigi Hadid, model Quannah Chasinghorse, and Italian fashion critic Angelo Flaccavento. ANDAM is a French fashion award established as a joint venture between the French Ministry of Culture and the Défi Mode fashion organisation.

In 2023 and 2024, Trisha Shetty moderated the Young Activists Summit at the Palais des Nations, the United Nations headquarters in Geneva, honoring young social activists and providing a platform for their work on current social issues. The 2023 edition recognized five activists and included remarks from Tatiana Valovaya, Director‑General of UN Geneva, and Albert II, Prince of Monaco.

In 2025, Shetty joined the Global Women Leaders Summit hosted by the Georgetown Institute for Women, Peace and Security and chaired by Hillary Clinton, participating in the launch of the first cohort of The Women Changemakers Initiative, of which she is a member. Launched on the sidelines of the summit, the initiative facilitates cross-generational dialogue and collaboration among global women leaders, with the aim of advancing human rights, climate action, democratic values, and inclusive governance. Prior to this, Shetty was part of a 25-member high-level committee, which included Michelle Bachelet, former President of Chile; Patricia Espinosa; Julia Gillard, former Prime Minister of Australia; Dalia Grybauskaitė, former President of Lithuania; Marta Lucía Ramírez, Vice President of Colombia; and Ellen Johnson Sirleaf, former President of Liberia. The committee contributed to the drafting of the Beijing+25 report, an initiative of the Georgetown Institute for Women, Peace and Security, supported by the Rockefeller Foundation and in collaboration with Hillary Clinton. Shetty also participated in discussions on legal frameworks to support women as part of this initiative.

In 2025, Shetty was also recognized as one of 90 women on The Shift Is On magazine’s “90+1” list, curated in collaboration with activist Gloria Steinem and photographers Inez and Vinoodh and to celebrate Steinem’s 90 years of advocacy for gender equality. Other notable honorees included Selena Gomez, Billie Eilish, Melinda Gates, Deepika Padukone, Amal Clooney, and Angelina Jolie.

In 2026, Shetty was named a Young Global Leader by the World Economic Forum, as part of its Class of 2026. The programme recognises individuals under the age of 40 who have demonstrated outstanding leadership and a commitment to shaping a more sustainable and inclusive future across sectors including public service, business, and civil society.
