= Period poverty =

Economic justice issue related to female periods

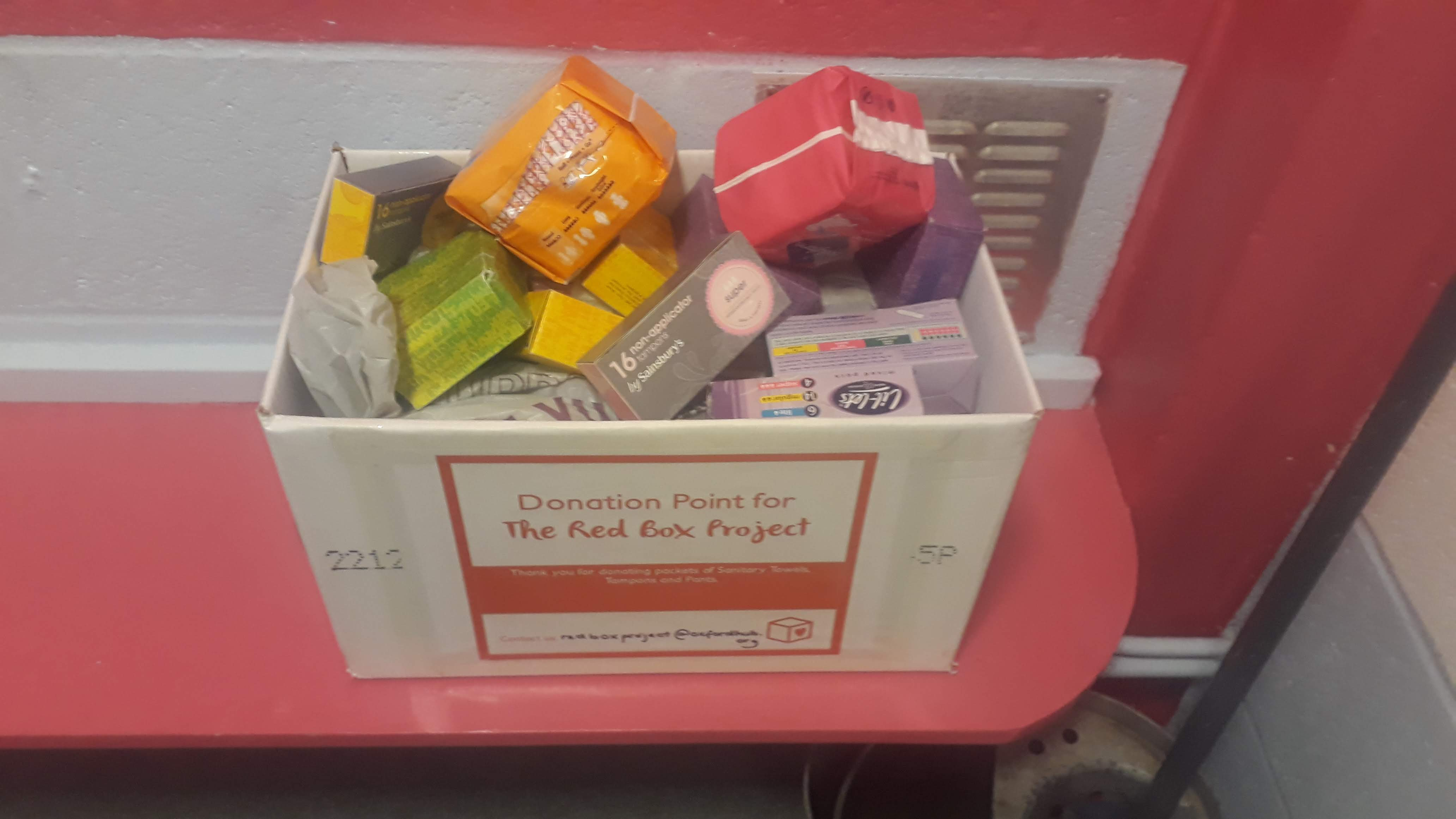
Red box with free products

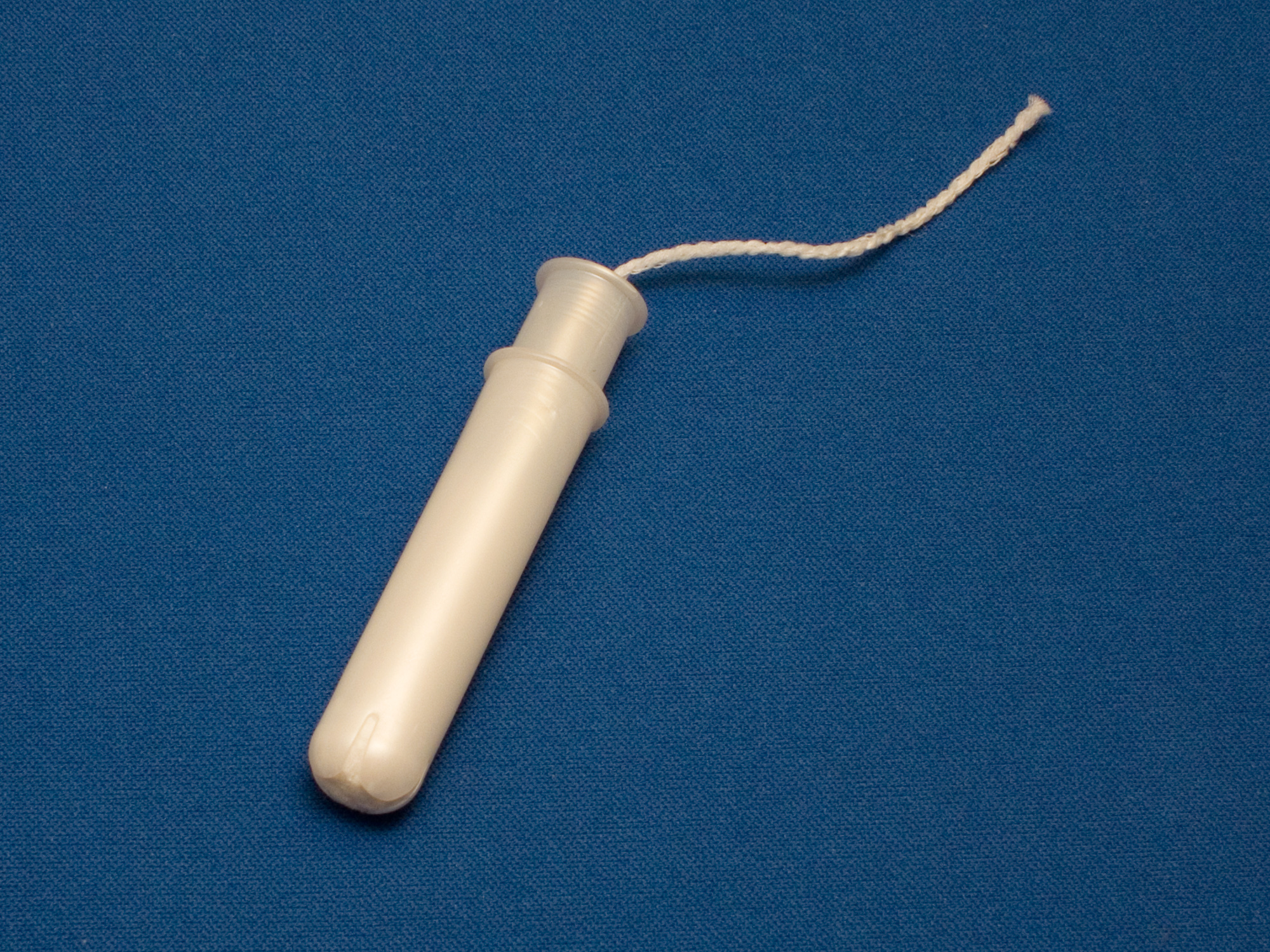
A tampon pictured with an application device

Period poverty is a term used to describe a lack of access to proper menstrual products and the education needed to use them effectively. In total, there are around 500 million women and girls that cannot manage their periods safely due to lack of menstrual products and for fear of shame. The American Medical Women's Association defines period poverty as "the inadequate access to menstrual hygiene tools and educations, including but not limited to sanitary products, washing facilities, and waste management". The lack of access to menstrual hygiene products can cause physical health problems, such as infections and reproductive tract complications, and can have negative social and psychological consequences, including missed school or work days and stigma.

The causes of consequences of period poverty intersect issues of gender equality and economic justice, and there are diverse acts of legislation and perceptions of period poverty around the world. Moreover, social media, consciousness raising, awareness campaigns, and the arts provide avenues for modern day advocacy regarding period poverty.

In addition to these understandings, the lack of period products and resources that are limited in period poverty, but the lack of access to safe water and sanitation to manage menstrual cycles in included in the definition of period poverty.

== Causes ==
A variety of cultural factors contribute to period poverty.

=== Menstrual stigma ===
One of the leading cultural factors that contributes to period poverty is menstrual stigma, also known as period shaming. The National Library of Medicine defines menstrual stigma as "the negative perception of menstruation and those who menstruate, characterizing the menstruating body as abnormal and abject". Menstrual stigma has significant impacts on the lives of those women including their health, education, economic opportunities, and participation in public and social life. The stigma can result in a lack of support for women and the propagation of harmful and misogynistic stereotypes. Period shaming can make women feel insecure about the menstrual process and thus less likely to carry period products on hand, as well as less likely to have conversations on menstrual health with friends and family members. Furthermore, the effects of this insecurity negatively manifests in the minds of society that further shapes their cultural and religious beliefs consolidating stigmatism and shame surrounding a women's menstrual cycle.

=== Historical and global perceptions of menstruation ===
Globally, women who menstruate often rely on euphemisms to discuss menstruation. For example, the use of these phrases such as "'strawberry week' in Austria, 'I'm with Chico' in Brazil, and 'Granny's stuck in traffic' in South Africa can contribute to the taboo surrounding menstruation. In some cultures around the world, menstrual blood itself is seen as unholy and women are encouraged to hide signs of menstrual bleeding from their male counterparts. These beliefs can be traced far back to the early stages of civilization. For example, in AD 70 Pliny the Elder wrote that menstruation was "productive of the most monstrous effects" and that crops would "wither and die" and bees would "forsake their hives if touched by a menstruous woman." In 1694, books on midwifery likened menstruating women to "a mythical beast with venomous breath" on account of their shared ability to "disperse poison through the air."

In the US specifically, Thinx found that 80% of sampled 13- to 19-year-olds believe periods have a negative association. This same study found that 57% have felt personally affected by this negative association, and 64% think society generally teaches girls to be ashamed of their periods.

=== Monetary and resource struggles ===
The sheer price of menstrual products prohibits large numbers of women and girls from being able to access necessary goods to manage their periods. Not only are products expensive, but legislation like the “pink tax,” in which products marketed for women are taxed at a greater rate than men, make it even more challenging for women to afford care products. Additionally, over 1.5 billion people lack access to basic sanitation services, including things like private toilets. This prevents women and girls from adequately caring for themselves during their period, and often results in women and girls missing work and school during their menstrual cycle further increasing the inequitable divide between men and women. Without access to minimum sanitation services and clean water, women are forced to rearrange their life during their periods. This is another cause of period poverty.

== Consequences ==
Physical, mental health, and social costs arise when women have limited or inconsistent access to period products and adequate menstrual hygiene management.

=== Physical health ===
A study from the Women's Health Group at Boston Medical Center centering on college-aged females in the United States reported that some women who could not afford pads or tampons used more cost-effective materials to prevent leakage, including rags, toilet paper, and children's diapers. If the materials are unsanitary, resorting to alternative methods to mitigate one's period can put them at higher risk of urogenital infections, such as bacterial vaginosis and urinary tract infections (UTIs). Moreover, women may leave tampons in their bodies longer than recommended and/ or use period products past their expiration dates. Using an unsterilised menstrual cup or leaving a tampon in for more than eight hours puts the user at risk for toxic shock syndrome, a life-threatening condition which can cause flu-like symptoms, low blood pressure, and organ failure. Menstrual products can also cause vaginal itchiness, irritation, and increased discharge when used after expiration. While a menstrual cup should be replaced every two years, tampons and pads typically expire after five years. Period poverty can additionally impact reproductive health, as those with female anatomy who lack access to adequate menstrual mitigation resources are at higher risk for infertility, recurrent abortions, and ectopic pregnancies.

=== Mental health ===
Furthermore, the lack of access to menstrual hygiene products and facilities can have negative impacts on women's mental health. Issue Five of HealthCare for Women International featured a study conducted in France regarding the impact of period poverty on the development of mental health issues found that 49.4% of women experiencing period poverty in their sample reported at least one symptom of anxiety or depression. Mental illnesses, in conjunction with period poverty, have the potential to exacerbate substance abuse, self-harm, and related concerns.

=== Society and the economy ===
The stigma surrounding menstruation can also contribute to shame and social exclusion for those who experience period poverty. For example, women who cannot afford products to mitigate leakage may opt to miss school or work because of their period. According to UNESCO's 2013 Global Education Monitoring Report, around 10% of youth who menstruate miss school during their period due to lack of access to menstrual health management (MHM) resources.

In addition, the economic costs of the COVID-19 pandemic contributed to heightened inequity, specifically surrounding period poverty. A United States-based study published in 2023 found that 18.5% of the women surveyed struggled to afford menstrual products during the pandemic. Period poverty also relates to the "pink tax", a hypothesis which alleges that health products marketed towards females are substantially more expensive than similar products marketed towards males. Specifically, a Stanford research study found that the average woman will spend approximately $18,000 on menstrual products in their lifetime. Students who menstruate also make up a large population of those who experience period poverty. Studies show that 19% of students who menstruate feel as though they need to decide between buying groceries or buying menstrual products each month.

== Period poverty and homelessness ==
Period poverty is an intersectional issue and unhoused women experiencing it have trouble accessing menstrual products due to economic constraints. Single women makeup a quarter of those experiencing homelessness in the UK; in the USA, it is a similar percentage as women account for 28% of the homeless population. Women experiencing homelessness struggle with access to menstrual products; shelters either lack or run out of menstrual products, access to public toilets can sometimes be tricky and often homeless women resort to theft to obtain menstrual products. Another common issues amongst homeless women is finding a safe space to effectively manage menstruation. It is difficult to find a clean, private space to utilize and change menstrual products. Homeless women report that public toilets are unsanitary and are not fit for changing their menstrual products. Additionally, the stigma around homelessness means often they are turned away from public and privately owned bathrooms. Sometimes makeshift pads constructed from clothing material, rags or waddled toilet paper are used as a substitute for menstrual products. Homeless women could feel uncomfortable asking staff at shelters for menstrual products; this can be a result of uneven power dynamics as well as the sociocultural stigmas around menstruation. Shelters themselves struggle with inconsistent supplies and can often resort to rationing menstrual supplies due to shipping failures. Improper period management can lead to adverse health effects, leaving a tampon in for too long can result in toxic shock syndrome or urinary tract infections, infrequent washing can cause skin infections and many other complications. These issues are exacerbated when an individual is unhoused.

== Period poverty in prisons ==
Globally, 740,000 women and girls are held in prison. The USA accounts for roughly 30% of the world's incarcerated women with about 211,375 female prisoners according to 2022 data. Countries with similar high rates of female prisoners are China with an estimated 145,000 (plus unknown women and girls held in pre-trial detention and administrative detention), Brazil (42,694), Russia (39,120) and Thailand (32,952). Understanding period poverty is to also acknowledge that not only women and girls menstruate but also transgender and non-binary people do as well. Period poverty in prisons arises from a penal system that weaponises menstruation as a form of oppression and punishment. Prisons often have an inadequate supply of menstrual products, increased pricing of menstrual products and poor quality of tools to manage menstruation.

Allotments for tampons and pads don't take into consideration the different requirements and needs of individuals to effectively manage their menstrual cycle. This results in incarcerated individuals having to bleed through their clothes or resorting to use unsuitable measures to manage their periods. Limited or deprivation of access to menstrual products leads to women in prisons using ripped bedsheets, mattress stuffing, socks, toilet paper and soiled, days-old tampons. In the Ivory Coast, women have severely limited or no access to menstrual products and due to overcrowding, the risk of infections is incredibly high.

As menstrual products aren't handed out freely and given at the will of prison staff, it has been documented that some prison guards have exchanged menstrual products for sexual favours or raped inmates. This demonstrates the unequal power dynamics between inmates and prison staff. In 2020, federal officer Colin Akparanta pled guilty to sexually abusing inmates in exchange for feminine hygiene products.

The carceral system still operates on a sex-segregated manner whereby an individual's biologically assigned legal sex dictates where they will be placed in the facility. There's little regard for differential experiences according to sexual orientation, gender identity, or gender expression. Given that menstruation is often assumed to be a process largely experienced by women, access to menstrual products for transgender and non-binary is far worse and often non-existent. This intersects with the denial and misgendering of trans and non-binary identities in the carceral system.

In the 2018, The First Step Act was passed in the USA. This legislation states that all federal prisons should make tampons and sanitary products available free of charge.

== Period poverty amongst transgender, non-binary, and intersex individuals ==
Period poverty is often discussed in the context of cisgender women. However, menstruation and period poverty also affect transgender, non-binary, and some intersex individuals, who may have varying gendered experiences surrounding menstruation. For these marginalised groups, accessing safe and accommodating spaces to manage menstruation can be fraught with challenges that can exacerbate feelings of insecurity and exclusion.

Accessing inclusive and affirming healthcare remains a significant hurdle for transgender, non-binary, and some intersex individuals experiencing menstruation. Despite efforts to accommodate diverse gender identities, misgendering and insensitive inquiries about menstruation persist, contributing to a sense of alienation and discomfort within healthcare settings.

Transgender, non-binary, and intersex people experience period poverty in tandem with discrimination and stigma due to their identities and sex. Trans, non-binary, and some intersex individuals have unique challenges when it comes to period poverty, including the lack of data collection as menstrual equity projects tend to only collect data related to women and girls.

Financial barriers add to the difficulty of accessing menstrual products as trans, non-binary and some intersex people already face economic constraints related to their gender identity, such as healthcare and other gender-affirming expenses. Menstruation isn't the only reason trans and non-binary people need menstrual products; trans women and non-binary people may also need pads and liners after vaginoplasty or for other reasons.

Gendered bathrooms present significant safety concerns for transgender, non-binary, and some intersex individuals during menstruation. Men's restrooms often lack discreet disposal options for period products, while women's restrooms may not feel safe for those who do not conform to traditional gender expectations. A study done on menstruation management for queer individuals found that 66% of respondents who used men's bathroom felt unsafe using them to change menstrual products; 39% of respondents who used female bathrooms felt uncomfortable doing so. Menstrual products are gendered as products for women thus they are often not placed in men's bathrooms.

The experience of menstruation intersects deeply with gender identity, shaping how transgender and genderqueer individuals perceive themselves and are perceived by others. Social interactions, public spaces, and even healthcare encounters can reinforce gender norms, complicating the already challenging experience of menstruation for these individuals. Packaging, designs, commercials, and "feminine product" aisles in stores serve as indicators to transgender, non-binary and intersex people that a biological aspect of their bodies is deeply tied to social norms and expectations of femininity and womanhood. In 2020, Always removed the Venus symbol from the packaging of their menstruation products after protests from LGBTQ activists, who were in favor of packaging inclusive to transgender and non-binary customers.

== Legislation on menstrual equity ==
=== United States ===
As of 2023, 26 US states have passed or enacted menstrual equity bills related to solving period poverty. The breakdown for where these bills exist is as follows:

- 1 bill: Alabama, Alaska, Arizona, Colorado, Connecticut, Florida, Georgia, Iowa, Louisiana, Mississippi, Nebraska, Nevada, New Hampshire, New Mexico, New York, Ohio, Rhode Island and Vermont
- 4 bills: Delaware, Texas
- 5 bills: California, Michigan
- 7 bills: Illinois
- 9 bills: Maryland

The bulk of these bills are concerned with providing menstrual health products to incarcerated people, as well as providing them in nurse's offices and bathrooms within that state's school districts. Additionally, many states have passed bills to lessen (or remove entirely) sales taxes on feminine hygiene products.

=== Worldwide ===
Globally, proposals to reduce or eliminate taxes on menstrual products or their inputs have gained prominence, and an increasing number of countries have taken different approaches. Developing countries are adopting diverse approaches to combat period poverty, reflecting a growing recognition of menstrual health as a vital public health and gender equality issue. In general, a common legislative approach adopted by many developing countries in the fight against period poverty is the reduction or elimination of taxes on menstrual products.

Bangladesh decided to waive the value-added tax (VAT) on raw materials temporarily to encourage more local production of these goods. In 2004, Kenya started eliminating taxes on menstrual products and by 2016, it had also removed VAT on imported menstrual items and the raw materials needed for their production. Likewise, Nigeria exempted locally made products from VAT. Several countries including Malaysia, Lebanon, Tanzania, Colombia, and Mexico have eliminated VAT on menstrual products entirely. In the Philippines, deputies from different parties separately filed similar bills this year proposing a two-day menstrual leave for female employees in the workforce. The Philippine government has also provided education and information about menstrual health across 60 percent of schools.

Approaches in developed countries not only include tax reductions or eliminations but also range from providing free menstrual products and the implementation of supportive policies. For instance, Scotland created a significant milestone by being the pioneer in providing free menstrual products for everyone, marking a groundbreaking move to tackle the crucial matter of menstrual equality. Alongside this, educational reforms have been introduced in several countries, incorporating menstrual health education into school curricula. In the UK, as part of the Department for Education's guidance, all primary schools are required to teach pupils about menstrual health under the new Relationships and Health Education curriculum (RSHE). In Canada, B.C. has committed $750,000 in funding to the United Way to establish a task force that will look at long-term solutions for period poverty. Approximately half of the funding will go toward supporting the task force and half will go toward supplying free menstrual products for people who need them.

International organizations also play a global role. The World Health Organization (WHO) calls for menstrual Health to be recognized, framed, and addressed as a health and human rights issue, not a hygiene issue. Activists, including the youth, along with nonprofit organizations, have made significant efforts to bring attention to menstrual health concerns. The United Nations Population Fund (UNFPA) raised four approaches to promoting and improving menstrual health around the world:

- "Supplies and safe bathrooms: In 2017, 484,000 dignity kits, containing pads, soap, and underwear, were distributed in 18 countries affected by humanitarian emergencies. UNFPA also helps to improve safety in displacement camps, distributing flashlights and installing solar lights in bathing areas. Promoting menstrual health information and skills-building, projects include teaching girls to make reusable menstrual pads or raising awareness about menstrual cups."
- "Improving education and information: Through its youth programs and comprehensive sexuality education efforts, UNFPA helps both boys and girls understand that menstruation is healthy and normal."
- "Supporting national health systems: Efforts include promoting menstrual health and providing treatment to girls and women suffering from menstrual disorders. The agency also procures reproductive health commodities that can be useful for treating menstruation-related disorders."
- "Gathering data and evidence about menstrual health and its connection to global development: A long overlooked topic of research, UNFPA-supported surveys provide critical insight into girls' and women's knowledge about their menstrual cycles, health, and access to sanitation facilities."

=== Representation ===
There is an argument to be made that the descriptive representation of women in executive and legislative bodies may bring about more government-level remedies to period poverty. For example, Sarah Childs and Julie Withey investigated the decision of Great Britain's Labour Party-led government to reduce the value-added tax on sanitary products in their 2000 budget. They found that, although it was then-Chancellor Gordon Brown who put forth the budget, it was the actions of MP Christine McCafferty that spearheaded this decision. In the years leading up to 2000 the Parliamentary Labor Party Women's Group put the VAT reduction at the forefront of their agenda, and it was McCafferty's membership on this group that perhaps compelled her to table 3 early day motions (EDMs) in the months leading up to budgeting on this same topic. In the run-up to the budget session McCafferty conducted an interview on BBC Woman's Hour, implying that this reduction would be made in the upcoming budget. This shifted the conversation surrounding the VAT from its own policy measure to a budget commitment, which made it easier to get passed.

== Advocacy efforts and media representation ==
A lack of media coverage regarding period poverty and its consequences is said to have further propagated the negation of how severe the issue is. Period poverty began receiving increased acknowledgment in media and news outlets around the early to mid-2010s. It gained more significant attention and traction as a social and public health issue in the latter part of the decade, with a notable increase in coverage and discussion in mainstream media, advocacy campaigns, and public policy initiatives.

=== News ===
Sociocultural attention to period poverty in the UK has increased since 2016, attributed to factors like the dismantling of the welfare state, menstruation-focused feminism, and support from high-profile individuals. Digital activism including celebrity endorsements and political commitments have encouraged period poverty discourse. Analysis displays how period poverty mediates discussions around impoverishment and class in contemporary UK society. The BBC published a compilation of articles regarding period poverty authored by a diverse range of individuals with personal interest to the issue. While in the US, MSNBC aired Morning Joe, centralized on period poverty hosted by Morgan Radford. An additional example is a news article published by the UN News regarding The Gambia and UNFPA's efforts to address period poverty by distributing sanitary pads and pressing for international acknowledgement through Menstrual Hygiene Day.

=== Social media ===
Social media have publicized discussion surrounding menstruation and period poverty in a unique manner that encourages open dialogue. Campaigns like #tweetyourperiod and #Periodsarenotaninsult have started discussions about sustainability and menstrual health among diverse audiences. Nadya Okamoto, founder of the organization PERIOD., utilized TikTok to reach a vast demographic of consumers to drive advocacy efforts. Her venture, August, selling sustainable menstrual products, exemplifies social media's role in mobilizing support for social causes like menstrual equity. Candice Chirwa, 'The Minister of Menstruation,' and Siv Ngesi, co-founder of The MENstruation Foundation, utilize social media to combat period poverty in South Africa. Through platforms like Instagram and Twitter, they raise awareness and engage communities in education and product distribution efforts.

=== Film and documentary ===
The academy award-winning Netflix documentary, "Period. End of Sentence.," elucidates the period poverty prevalent in rural India and the transformative impact of making menstrual products accessible. Through the innovation of a sanitary pad machine in a village adjacent to New Delhi, women were empowered to manufacture and market their own pads. This catalyzed the emergence of a female-dominated industry deterring menstrual and gender inequality, especially in the workforce. "Pandora's Box: Lifting The Lid On Menstruation" is another instance of film displaying menstrual equity struggles globally. Led by a predominantly female team, the production exposes the struggles faced by women due to the lack of access to menstrual products, while simultaneously stressing the activism and advocacy efforts driving change.

=== Advocacy efforts ===
Roof and Roots in Lebanon, sustained by organizations like ACTED and UN Women, revolve around grassroots action and economic empowerment. Continued research, policy advocacy, and community-based interventions are exercised to address period poverty and promote menstrual justice. PERIOD. annually distributes menstrual products and engages in efforts such as authoring menstrual health curriculum and empowering young, developing leaders to advocate for menstrual justice policies. The organization prioritizes women's autonomy and the effort of eradicating period poverty through policy. Amika George, the founder of the Free Periods campaign, advocated for free sanitary products in UK schools at 17 years old. George emphasizes the potential for grassroots political involvement, embodying the value of individual activism on policy outcomes. Damaris Pereda, national programs director at PERIOD., played a significant role in advocating for menstrual equity in California, leading to the passing of AB 367 for free period products in academic institutions. This achievement reflects a global movement to increase access to menstrual products and combat menstrual inequity.

== See also ==
- Menstrual hygiene management
