= Mask =

Full or partial face covering

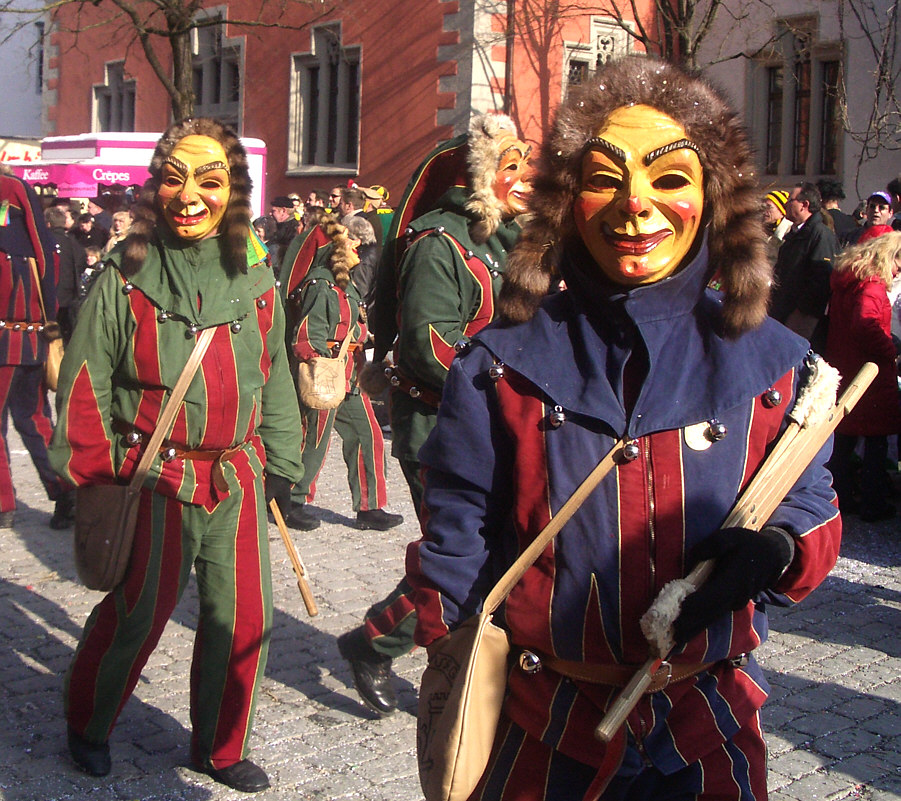
Papierkrattler masks at the Narrensprung 2005 Carnival parade, Ravensburg, Germany

A mask is an object normally worn on the face, typically for protection, disguise, performance, or entertainment, and often employed for rituals and rites. Masks have been used since antiquity for both ceremonial and practical purposes, as well as in the performing arts and for entertainment. They are usually worn on the face, though they may also be positioned elsewhere on the wearer's body for effect.

In art history, especially sculpture, "mask" is the term for a face without a body that is not modelled in the round (which would make it a "head"), but, for example, appears in low relief.

== Etymology ==
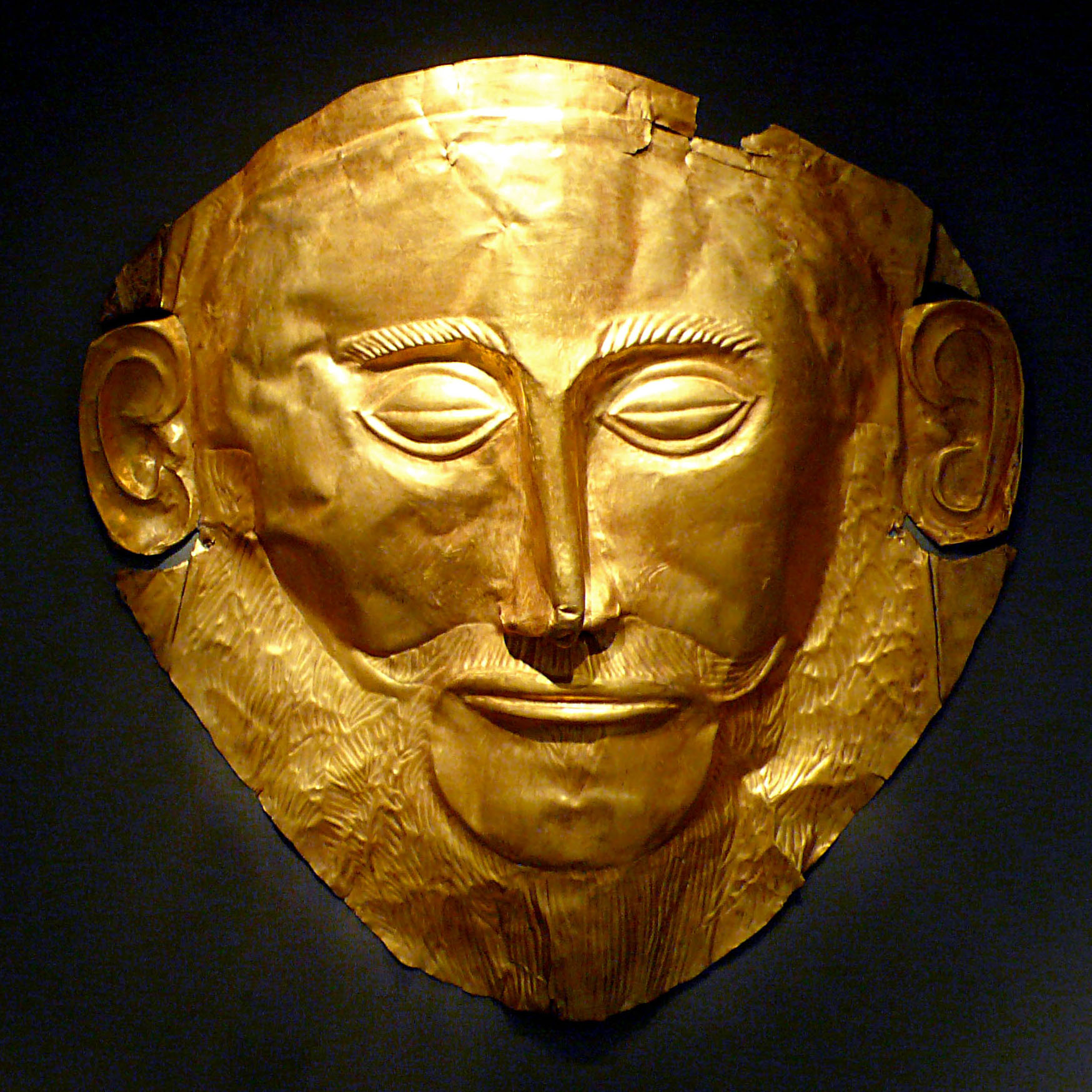
The so-called 'Mask of Agamemnon', a 16th-century BC mask discovered by Heinrich Schliemann in 1876 at Mycenae, Greece. Displayed at the National Archaeological Museum, Athens.

The word "mask" appeared in English in the 1530s, from Middle French masque "covering to hide or guard the face", derived in turn from Italian maschera, from Medieval Latin masca "mask, specter, nightmare". This word is of uncertain origin, perhaps from Arabic maskharah مَسْخَرَۃٌ "buffoon", from the verb sakhira "to ridicule". However, it may also come from Provençal mascarar "to black (the face)" (or the related Catalan mascarar, Old French mascurer). This in turn is of uncertain origin – perhaps from a Germanic source akin to English "mesh", but perhaps from mask- "black", a borrowing from a pre-Indo-European language. One German author claims the word "mask" is originally derived from the Spanish más que la cara (literally, "more than the face" or "added face"), which evolved to "máscara", while the Arabic "maskharat" – referring to the buffoonery which is possible only by disguising the face – would be based on these Spanish roots. Other related forms are Hebrew masecha= "mask"; Arabic maskhara مَسْخَرَ = "he ridiculed, he mocked", masakha مَسَخَ = "he transformed" (transitive).

== History ==
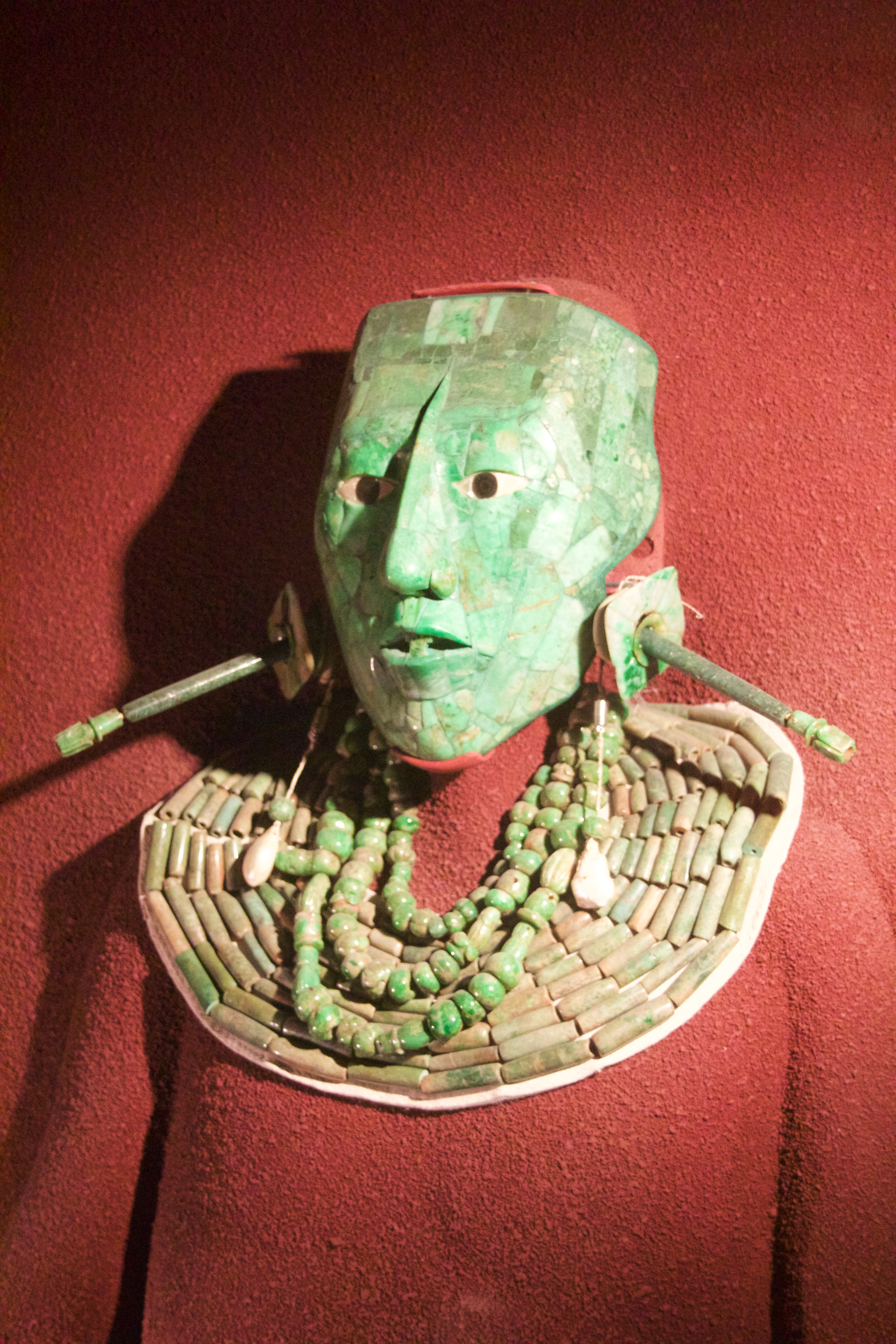
Funeral mask of K'inich Janaab' Pakal at the National Museum of Anthropology (Mexico)

The use of masks in rituals or ceremonies is a very ancient human practice across the world, although masks can also be worn for protection, in hunting, in sports, in feasts, or in wars – or simply used as ornamentation. Some ceremonial or decorative masks were not designed to be worn. Although the religious use of masks has waned, masks are used sometimes in drama therapy or psychotherapy.

One of the challenges in anthropology is finding the precise derivation of human culture and early activities, the invention and use of the mask is only one area of unsolved inquiry. The use of masks dates back several millennia. It is conjectured that the first masks may have been used by primitive people to associate the wearer with some kind of unimpeachable authority, such as a deity, or to otherwise lend credence to the person's claim on a given social role.

The earliest known anthropomorphic artwork is circa 30,000–40,000 years old. (Note: The oldest known example of the Venus figurines is the Venus of Hohle Fels, carbon-dated as 35,000 to 40,000 years old.) The use of masks is demonstrated graphically at some of these sites. Insofar as masks involved the use of war-paint, leather, vegetative material, or wooden material, such masks failed to be preserved, however, they are visible in Paleolithic cave drawings, of which dozens have been preserved. (Note: A famous example is the images of the Trois-Frères cave (circa 15,000 years old). According to John W. Nunley, "The earliest evidence of masking comes from the Mousterian site of Hortus in the south of France. There the archaeologist Henry de Lumley found remnants of a leopard skin that was probably worn as a costume more than 40,000 years ago" (Nunley, 1999, p. 22).) At the Neanderthal Roche-Cotard site in France, a flintstone likeness of a face was found that is approximately 35,000 years old, but it is not clear whether it was intended as a mask.

In the Greek bacchanalia and the Dionysus cult, which involved the use of masks, the ordinary controls on behaviour were temporarily suspended, and people cavorted in merry revelry outside their ordinary rank or status. René Guénon claims that in the Roman saturnalia festivals, the ordinary roles were often inverted. Sometimes a slave or a criminal was temporarily granted the insignia and status of royalty, only to be killed after the festival ended. The Carnival of Venice, in which all are equal behind their masks, dates back to 1268 AD. The use of carnivalesque masks in the Jewish Purim festivities probably originated in the late 15th century, although some Jewish authors claim it has always been part of Judaic tradition.

The North American Iroquois tribes used masks for healing purposes (see False Face Society). In the Himalayas, masks functioned above all as mediators of supernatural forces. Yup'ik masks could be small 3-inch (7.6 cm) finger masks, but also 10-kilogram (22 lb) masks hung from the ceiling or carried by several people. Masks have been created with plastic surgery for mutilated soldiers.

Masks in various forms – sacred, practical, or playful – have played a crucial historical role in the development of understandings about "what it means to be human", because they permit the imaginative experience of "what it is like" to be transformed into a different identity (or to affirm an existing social or spiritual identity). Not all cultures have known the use of masks, but most of them have. (Note: Pernet emphasizes that masks are not a wholly universal cultural phenomenon, raising the question why some cultures do not have a masking tradition.)

== Masks in performance ==
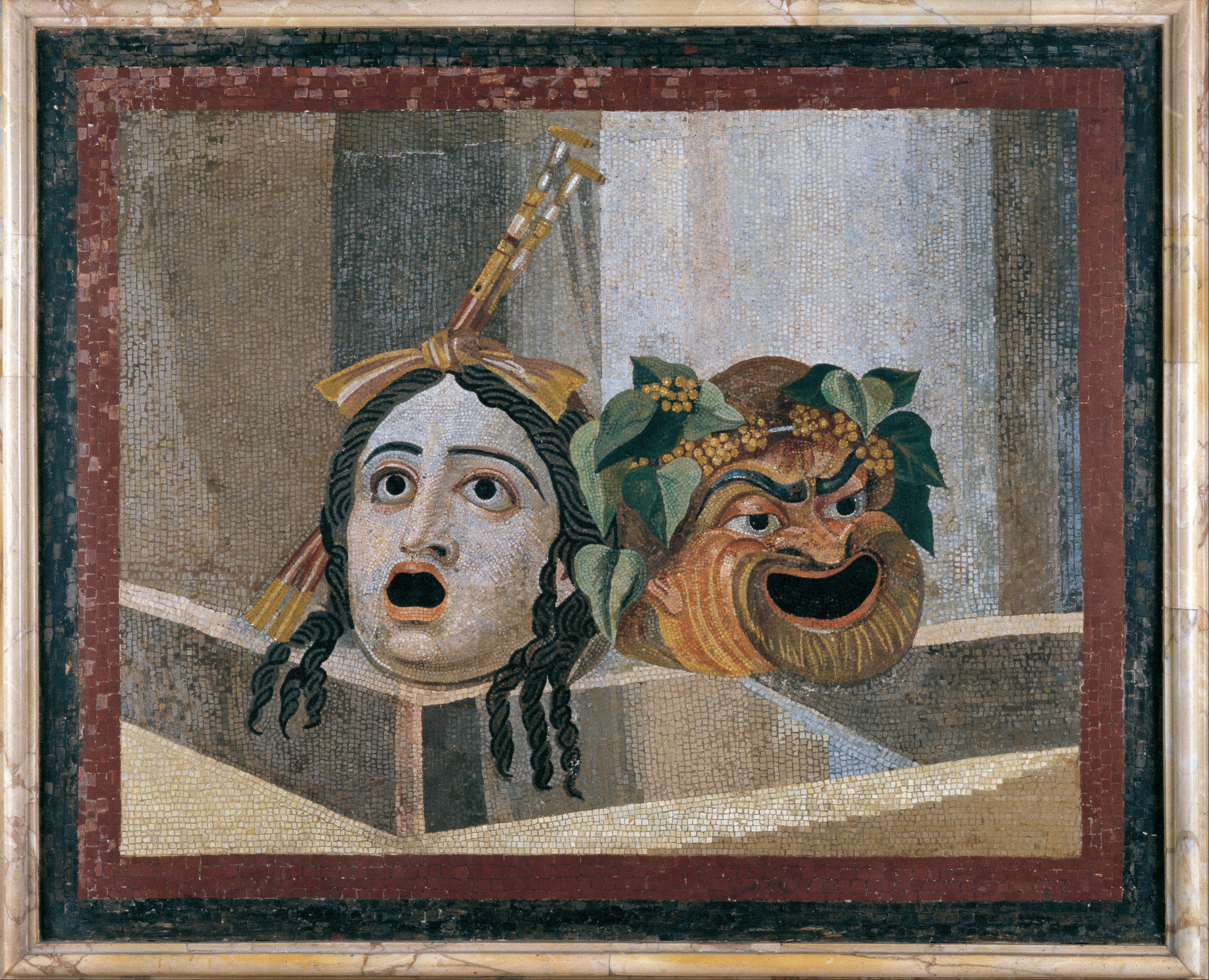
Theatrical masks of Tragedy and Comedy. Roman mosaic, second century AD.

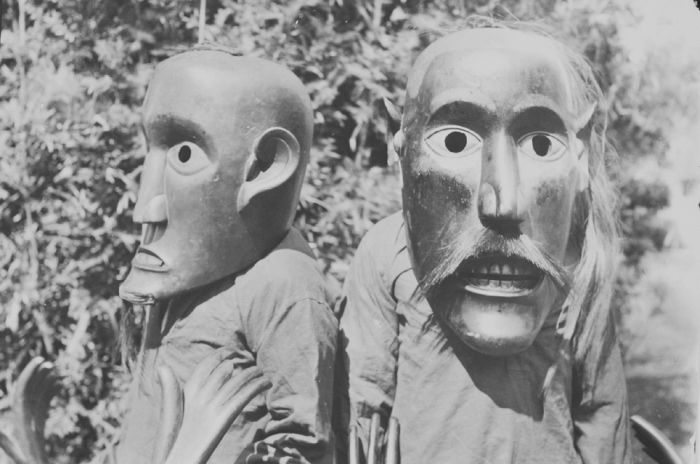
Batak mask dance at a funeral feast in the Dutch East Indies, 1930s

Throughout the world, masks are used for their expressive power as a feature of masked performance – both ritually and in various theatre traditions. The ritual and theatrical definitions of mask use frequently overlap and merge but still provide a useful basis for categorisation. The image of juxtaposed comedy and tragedy masks are widely used to represent the performing arts, and specifically drama.

In many dramatic traditions including the theatre of ancient Greece, the classical noh drama of Japan (14th century to present), the traditional lhamo drama of Tibet, talchum in Korea, and the topeng dance of Indonesia, masks were or are typically worn by all the performers, with several different types of mask used for different types of character.

In Ancient Rome, the word persona meant 'a mask'; it also referred to an individual who had full Roman citizenship. A citizen could demonstrate his or her lineage through imagines – death masks of ancestors. These were wax casts kept in a lararium (the family shrine). Rites of passage, such as initiation of young members of the family or funerals, were carried out at the shrine under the watch of the ancestral masks. At funerals, professional actors would wear these masks to perform deeds of the lives of the ancestors, thus linking the role of mask as a ritual object and in theatre.

Masks are a familiar and vivid element in many folk and traditional pageants, ceremonies, rituals, and festivals, and are often of an ancient origin. The mask is normally a part of a costume that adorns the whole body and embodies a tradition important to the religious and/or social life of the community as whole or a particular group within the community. Masks are used almost universally and maintain their power and mystery both for their wearers and their audience. The continued popularity of wearing masks at carnival, and for children at parties and for festivals such as Halloween are good examples. Nowadays these are usually mass-produced plastic masks, often associated with popular films, television programmes, or cartoon characters – they are, however, reminders of the enduring power of pretense and play and the power and appeal of masks.

== Ritual masks ==
Ritual masks occur throughout the world, and although they tend to share many characteristics, highly distinctive forms have developed. The function of the masks may be magical or religious; they may appear in rites of passage or as a make-up for a form of theatre. Equally masks may disguise a penitent or preside over important ceremonies; they may help mediate with spirits, or offer a protective role to the members of a society who use their powers. Biologist Jeremy Griffith has suggested that ritual masks, as representations of the human face, are extremely revealing of the two fundamental aspects of the human psychological condition: firstly, the repression of a cooperative, instinctive self or soul; and secondly, the extremely angry state of the unjustly condemned conscious thinking egocentric intellect.

In parts of Australia, giant totem masks cover the body.

=== Africa ===
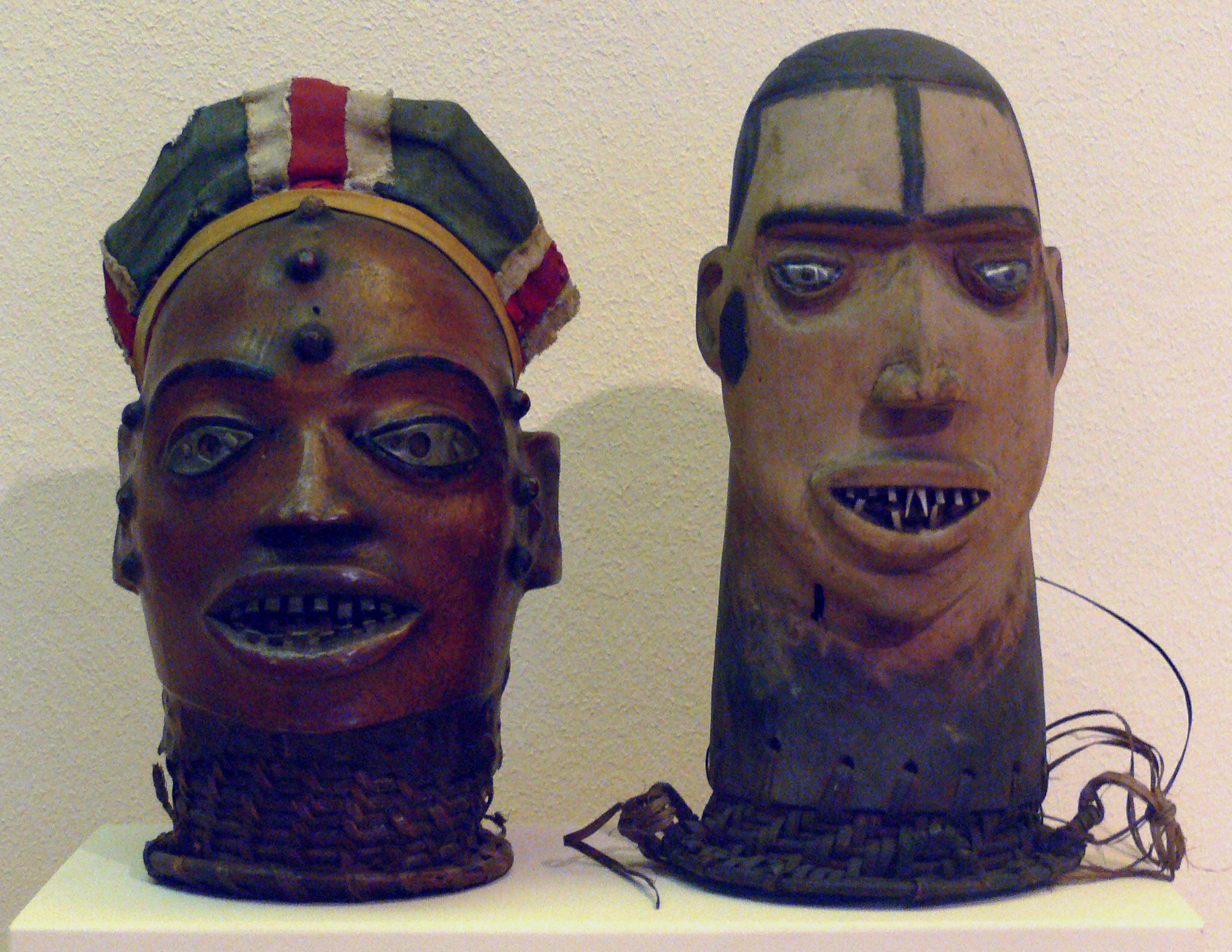
Masks of Cameroon

There are a wide variety of masks used in Africa. In West Africa, masks are used in masquerades that form part of religious ceremonies enacted to communicate with spirits and ancestors. Examples are the masquerades of the Yoruba, Igbo, and Edo cultures, including Egungun Masquerades and Northern Edo Masquerades. The masks are usually carved with an extraordinary skill and variety by artists who will usually have received their training as an apprentice to a master carver – frequently it is a tradition that has been passed down within a family through many generations. Such an artist holds a respected position in tribal society because of the work that he or she creates, embodying not only complex craft techniques but also spiritual/social and symbolic knowledge. African masks are also used in the Mas or Masquerade of the Caribbean Carnival.

Djolé (also known as Jolé or Yolé) is a mask-dance from Temine people in Sierra Leone. Males wear the mask, although it does depict a female.

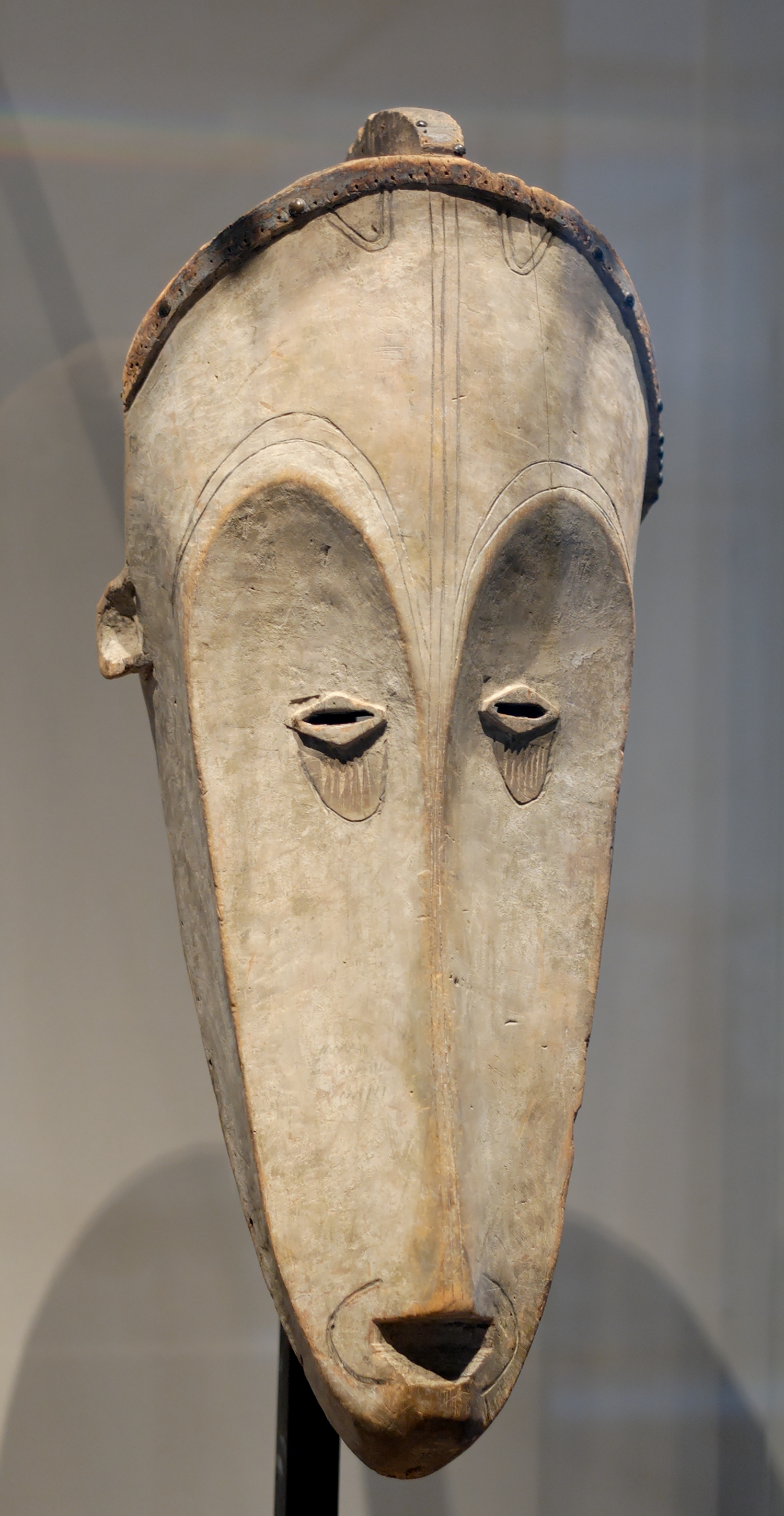
Fang mask used for the ngil ceremony, an inquisitorial search for sorcerers. Wood, Gabon, 19th century.

Many African masks represent animals. Some African tribes believe that the animal masks can help them communicate with the spirits who live in forests or open savannas. People of Burkina Faso known as the Bwa and Nuna call to the spirit to stop destruction. The Dogon of Mali have complex religions that also have animal masks. Their three main cults use seventy-eight different types of masks. Most of the ceremonies of the Dogon culture are secret, although the antelope dance is shown to non-Dogons. The antelope masks are rough rectangular boxes with several horns coming out of the top. The Dogons are expert agriculturists and the antelope symbolizes a hard-working farmer.

Another culture that has a very rich agricultural tradition is the Bamana people of Mali. The antelope (called Chiwara) is believed to have taught man the secrets of agriculture. Although the Dogons and Bamana people both believe the antelope symbolises agriculture, they interpret elements the masks differently. To the Bamana people, swords represent the sprouting of grain.

Masks may also indicate a culture's ideal of feminine beauty. The masks of Punu of Gabon have highly arched eyebrows, almost almond-shaped eyes and a narrow chin. The raised strip running from both sides of the nose to the ears represent jewellery. Dark black hairstyle, tops the mask off. The whiteness of the face represents the whiteness and beauty of the spirit world. Only men wear the masks and perform the dances with high stilts despite the fact that the masks represent women. One of the most beautiful representations of female beauty is the Idia's Mask of Benin in present-day Edo State of Nigeria. It is believed to have been commissioned by a king of Benin in memory of his mother. To honor his dead mother, the king wore the mask on his hip during special ceremonies.

The Senoufo people of the Ivory Coast represent tranquility by making masks with eyes half-shut and lines drawn near the mouth. The Temne of Sierra Leone use masks with small eyes and mouths to represent humility and humbleness. They represent wisdom by making bulging forehead. Other masks that have exaggerated long faces and broad foreheads symbolize the soberness of one's duty that comes with power. War masks are also popular. The Grebo of the Ivory Coast and Liberia carve masks with round eyes to represent alertness and anger, with the straight nose to represent unwillingness to retreat.

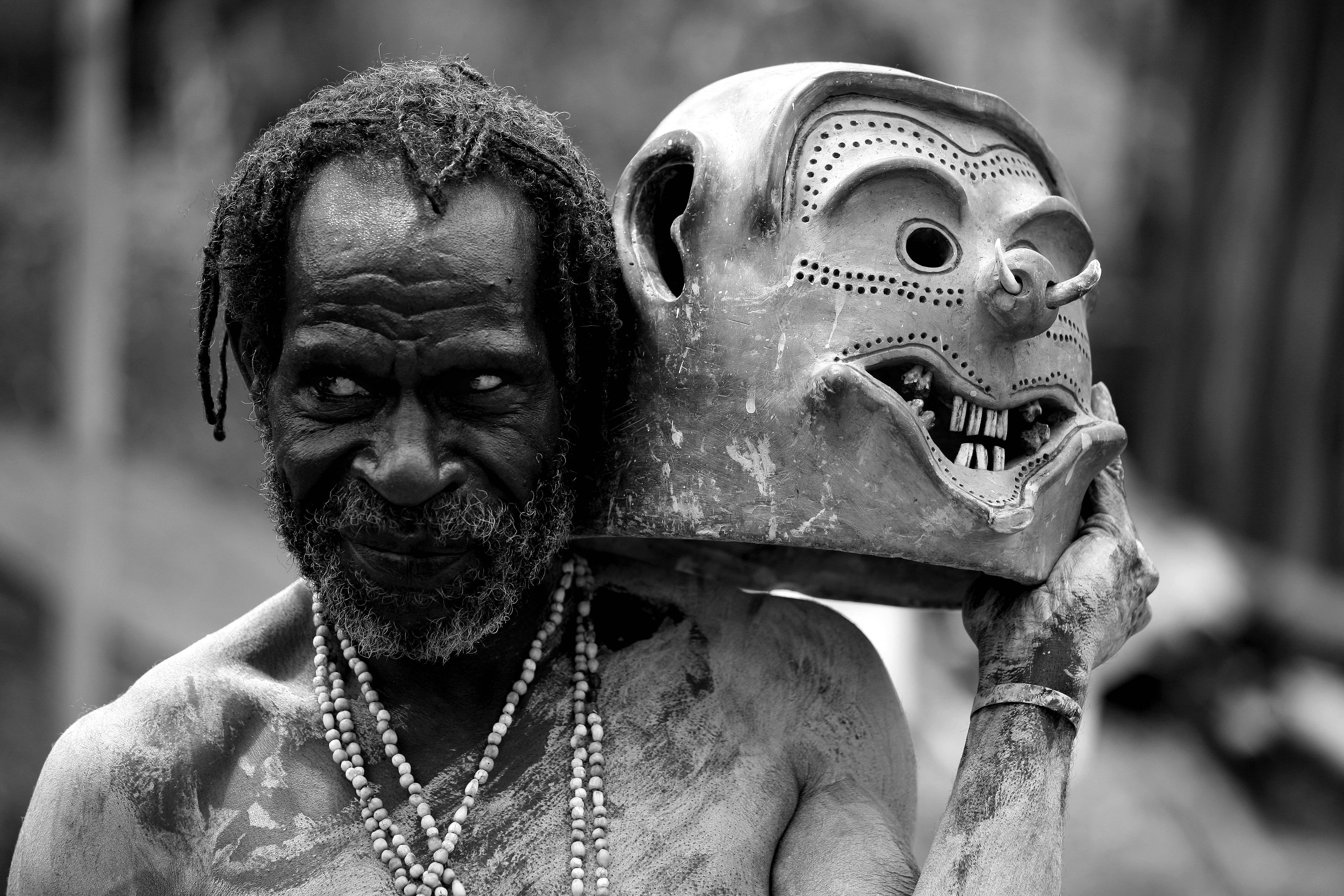
Asaro mudman holding mask, Papua New Guinea

Today, the qualities of African art are beginning to be more understood and appreciated. However, most African masks are now being produced for the tourist trade. Although they often show skilled craftsmanship, they nearly always lack the spiritual character of the traditional tribal masks.

=== Oceania ===
The variety and beauty of the masks of Melanesia are almost as highly developed as in Africa. It is a culture where ancestor worship is dominant and religious ceremonies are devoted to ancestors. Inevitably, many of the mask types relate to use in these ceremonies and are linked with the activities of secret societies. The mask is regarded as an instrument of revelation, giving form to the sacred. This is often accomplished by linking the mask to an ancestral presence, and thus bringing the past into the present.

As a culture of scattered islands and peninsulars, Melanesian mask forms have developed in a highly diversified fashion, with a great deal of variety in their construction and aesthetic. In Papua New Guinea, six-metre-high totem masks are placed to protect the living from spirits; whereas the duk-duk and tubuan masks of New Guinea are used to enforce social codes by intimidation. They are conical masks, made from cane and leaves.

=== North America ===
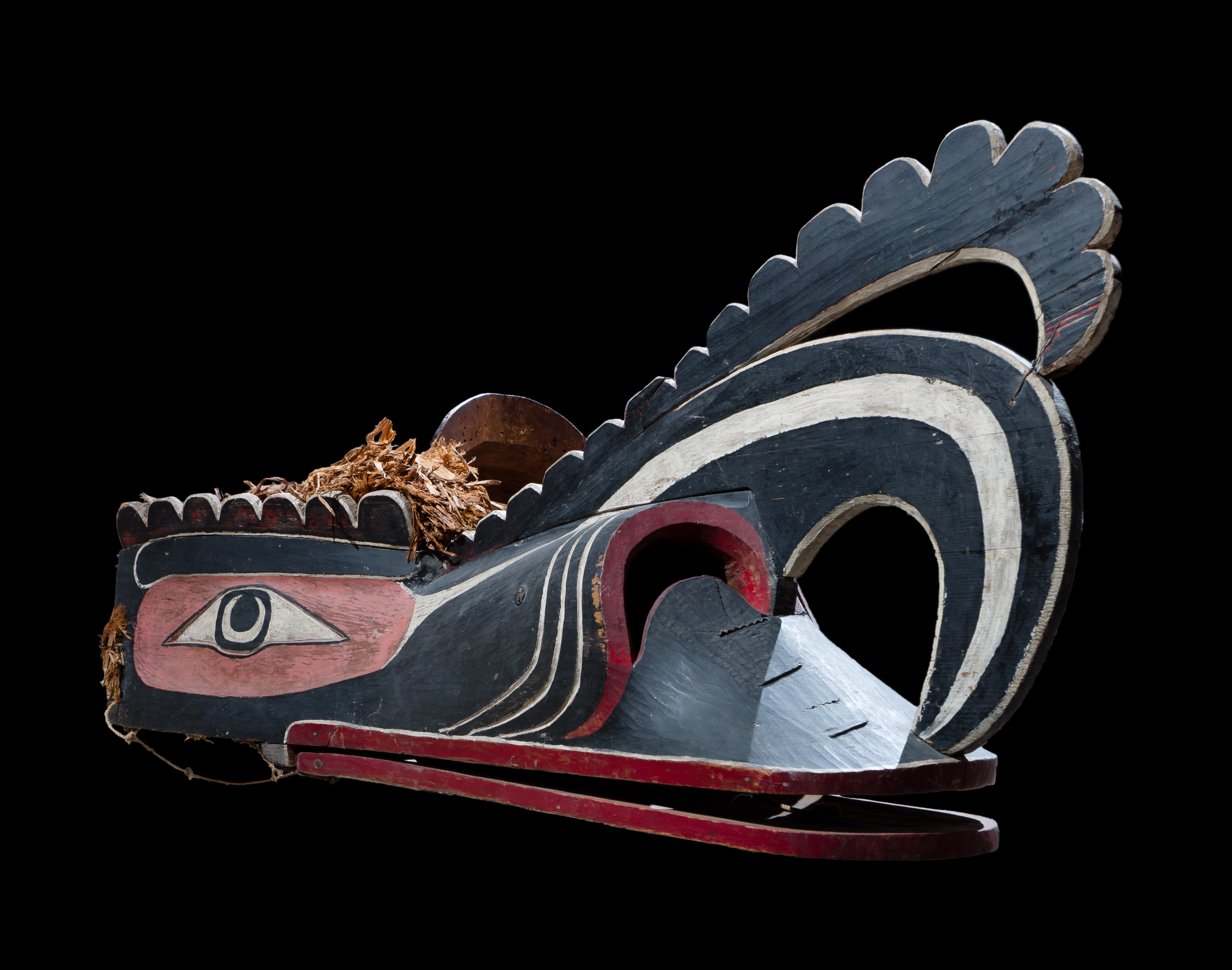
Kwakwaka'wakw ritual mask (painted wood, fiber, and cord)

North American indigenous cultures in the Arctic and para-Arctic regions have tended towards simple religious practice but a highly evolved and rich mythology, especially concerning hunting. In some areas, annual shamanic ceremonies involved masked dances and these strongly abstracted masks are arguably the most striking artifacts produced in this region. Inuit groups vary widely and share neither a common mythology nor language. Not surprisingly their mask traditions are also often different, although their masks are often made out of driftwood, animal skins, bones, and feathers. In some areas Inuit women use finger masks during storytelling and dancing.

Indigenous Pacific Northwest coastal cultural groups generally included highly skilled woodworkers. Their masks were often masterpieces of carving, sometimes with movable jaws, with the parts sometimes moved by pulling cords, or a mask within a mask to represent a magical transformation. The carving of masks was an important feature of woodcraft, along with many other features that often combined the utilitarian with the symbolic, such as shields, canoes, poles, and houses.

Woodland tribes, especially in the northeastern and around the Great Lakes, cross-fertilized culturally with one another. The Iroquois made spectacular wooden 'false face' masks, used in healing ceremonies and carved from living trees. These masks appear in a great variety of shapes, depending on their precise function.

Pueblo craftsmen produced impressive work for masked religious ritual, especially the Hopi and Zuni. The kachinas (gods and spirits) frequently take the form of highly distinctive and elaborate masks that are used in ritual dances. These are usually made of leather with appendages of fur, feathers, or leaves. Some cover the face, some the whole head, and are often highly abstracted forms. Navajo masks appear to be inspired by the Pueblo prototypes.

In modern immigrant Euro-American culture, masking is a common feature of Mardi Gras traditions, most notably in New Orleans. Costumes and masks (originally inspired by masquerade balls) are frequently worn by "krewe"-members on Mardi Gras Day; local laws against using a mask to conceal one's identity are suspended for the day.

=== Latin America ===
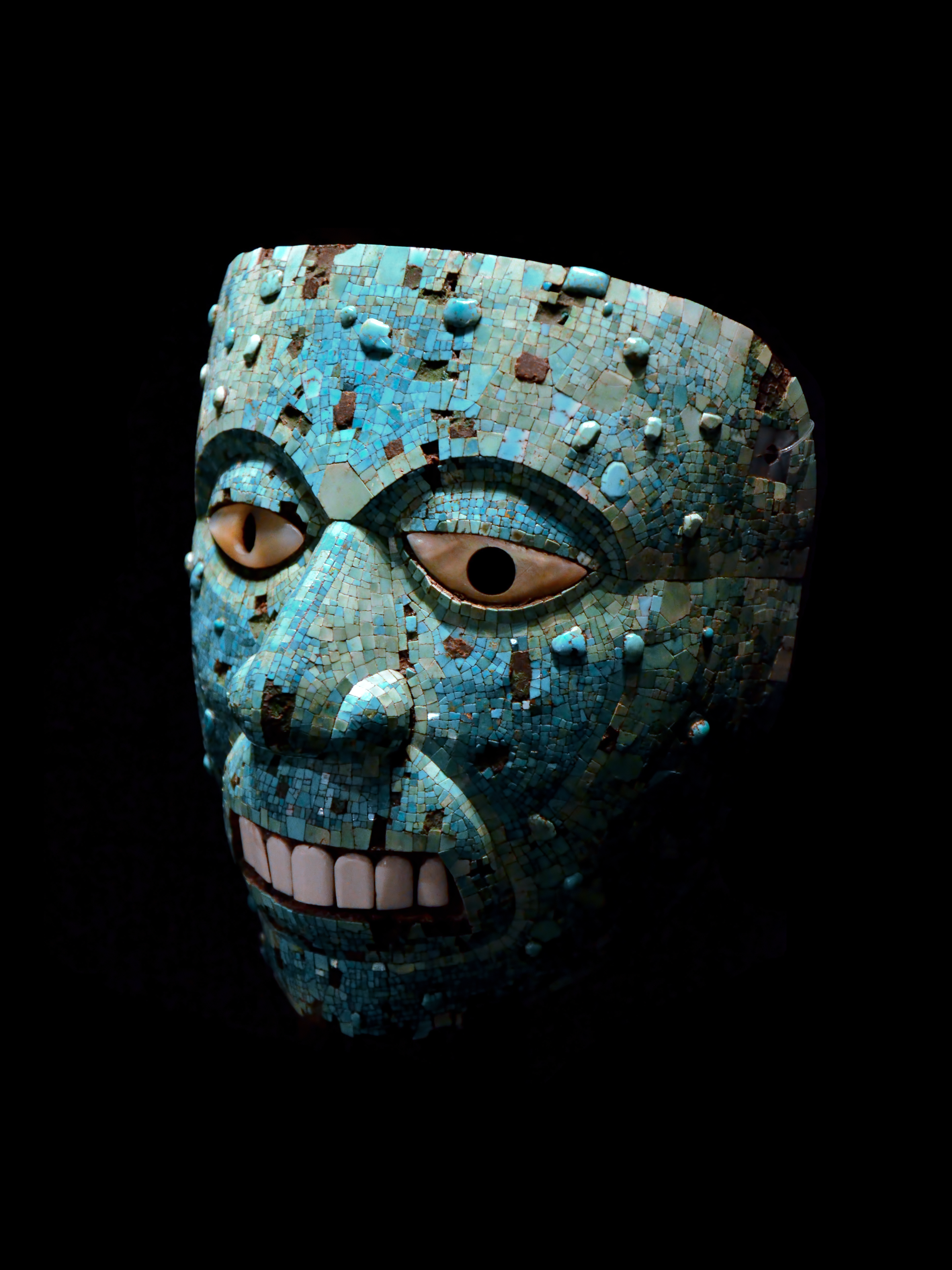
Aztec mask of Xiuhtecuhtli, c. 1500, of Mixtec-Aztec provenance

Distinctive styles of masks began to emerge in pre-Hispanic America about 1200 BC, although there is evidence of far older mask forms. In the Andes, masks were used to dress the faces of the dead. These were originally made of fabric, but later burial masks were sometimes made of beaten copper or gold, and occasionally of clay.

For the Aztecs, human skulls were prized as war trophies, and skull masks were not uncommon. Masks were also used as part of court entertainments, possibly combining political with religious significance.

In post-colonial Latin America, pre-Columbian traditions merged with Christian rituals, and syncretic masquerades and ceremonies, such as All Souls/Day of the Dead developed, despite efforts of the Church to stamp out the indigenous traditions. Masks remain an important feature of popular carnivals and religious dances, such as The Dance of the Moors and Christians. Mexico, in particular, retains a great deal of creativity in the production of masks, encouraged by collectors. Wrestling matches, where it is common for the participants to wear masks, are very popular, and many of the wrestlers can be considered folk heroes. For instance, the popular wrestler El Santo continued wearing his mask after retirement, revealed his face briefly only in old age, and was buried wearing his silver mask.

=== Asia ===
==== China ====
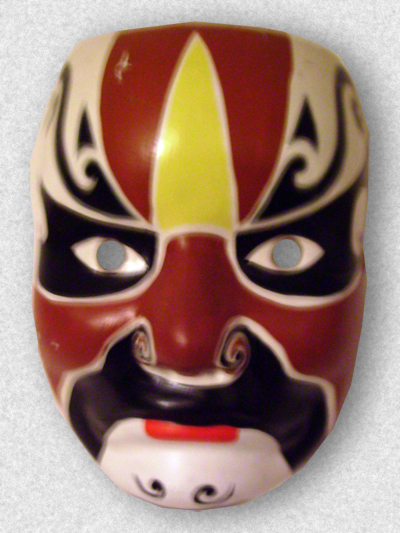
A Peking opera mask

In China, masks are thought to have originated in ancient religious ceremonies. Images of people wearing masks have been found in rock paintings along the Yangtze. Later mask forms brings together myths and symbols from shamanism and Buddhism.

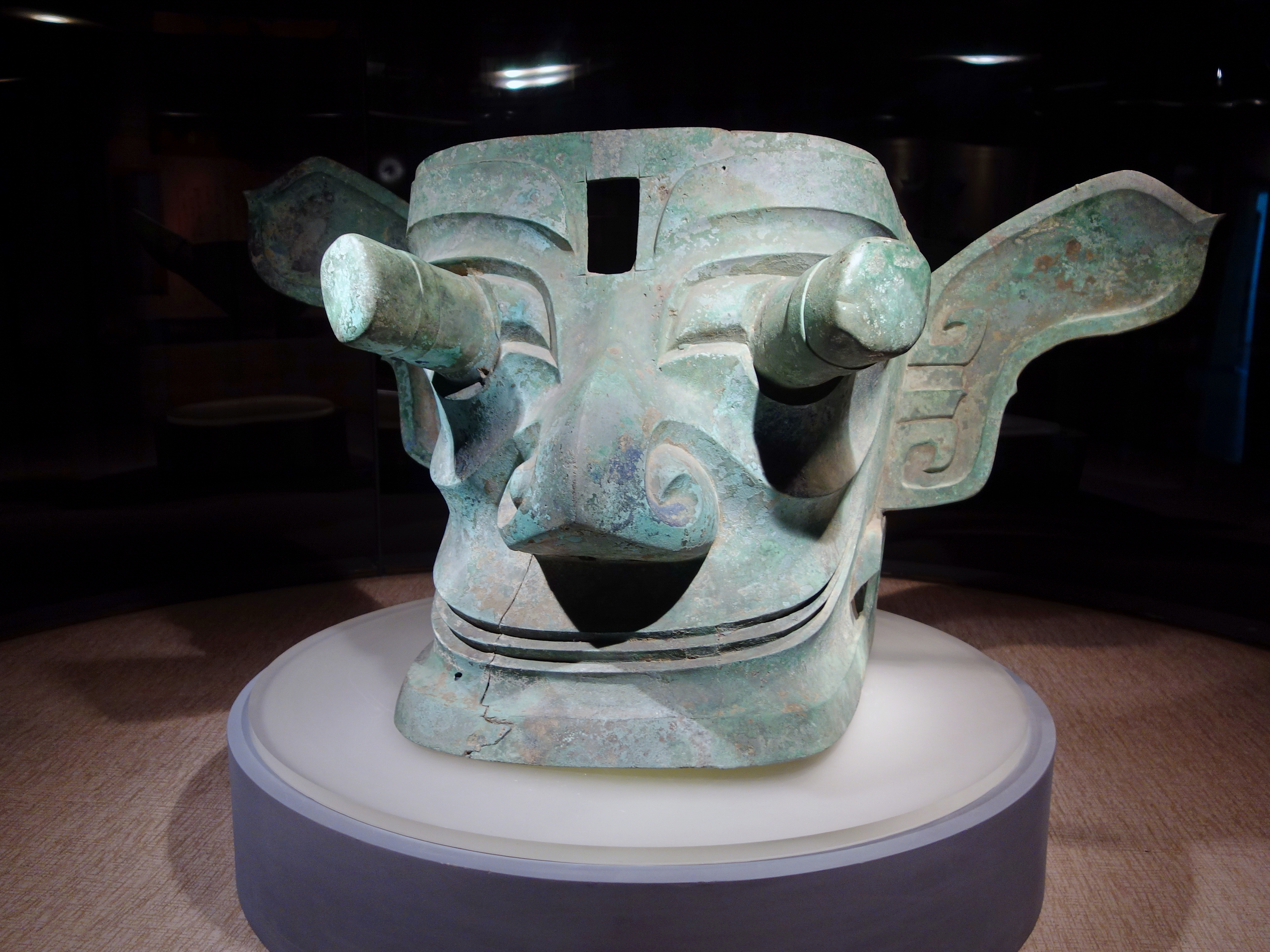
Sanxingdui Bronze Mask with Protruding Eyes, Shu

Shigong dance masks were used in shamanic rituals to thank the gods, while nuo dance masks protected from bad spirits. Wedding masks were used to pray for good luck and a lasting marriage, and "Swallowing Animal" masks were associated with protecting the home and symbolised the "swallowing" of disaster. Opera masks were used in a basic "common" form of opera performed without a stage or backdrops. These led to colourful facial patterns that we see in today's Peking opera.

==== India/Sri Lanka/Indo-China ====
Masked characters, usually divinities, are a central feature of Indian dramatic forms, many based on depicting the epics Mahabharata and Ramayana. Countries that have had strong Indian cultural influences – Cambodia, Indonesia, Laos, Myanmar, and Thailand – have developed the Indian forms, combined with local myths, and developed their own characteristic styles.

The masks are usually highly exaggerated and formalised, and share an aesthetic with the carved images of monstrous heads that dominate the facades of Hindu and Buddhist temples. These faces or Kirtimukhas, 'Visages of Glory', are intended to ward off evil and are associated with the animal world as well as the divine. During ceremonies, these visages are given active form in the great mask dramas of the South and South-eastern Asian region.

==== Indonesia ====
In Indonesia, the mask dance predates Hindu-Buddhist influences. It is believed that the use of masks is related to the cult of the ancestors, which considered dancers the interpreters of the gods. Native Indonesian tribes such as Dayak have masked Hudoq dance that represents nature spirits. In Java and Bali, masked dance is commonly called topeng and demonstrated Hindu influences as it often feature epics such as Ramayana and Mahabharata. The native story of Panji also popular in topeng masked dance. Indonesian topeng dance styles are widely distributed, such as topeng Bali, Cirebon, Betawi, Malang, Yogyakarta, and Solo.

==== Japan ====
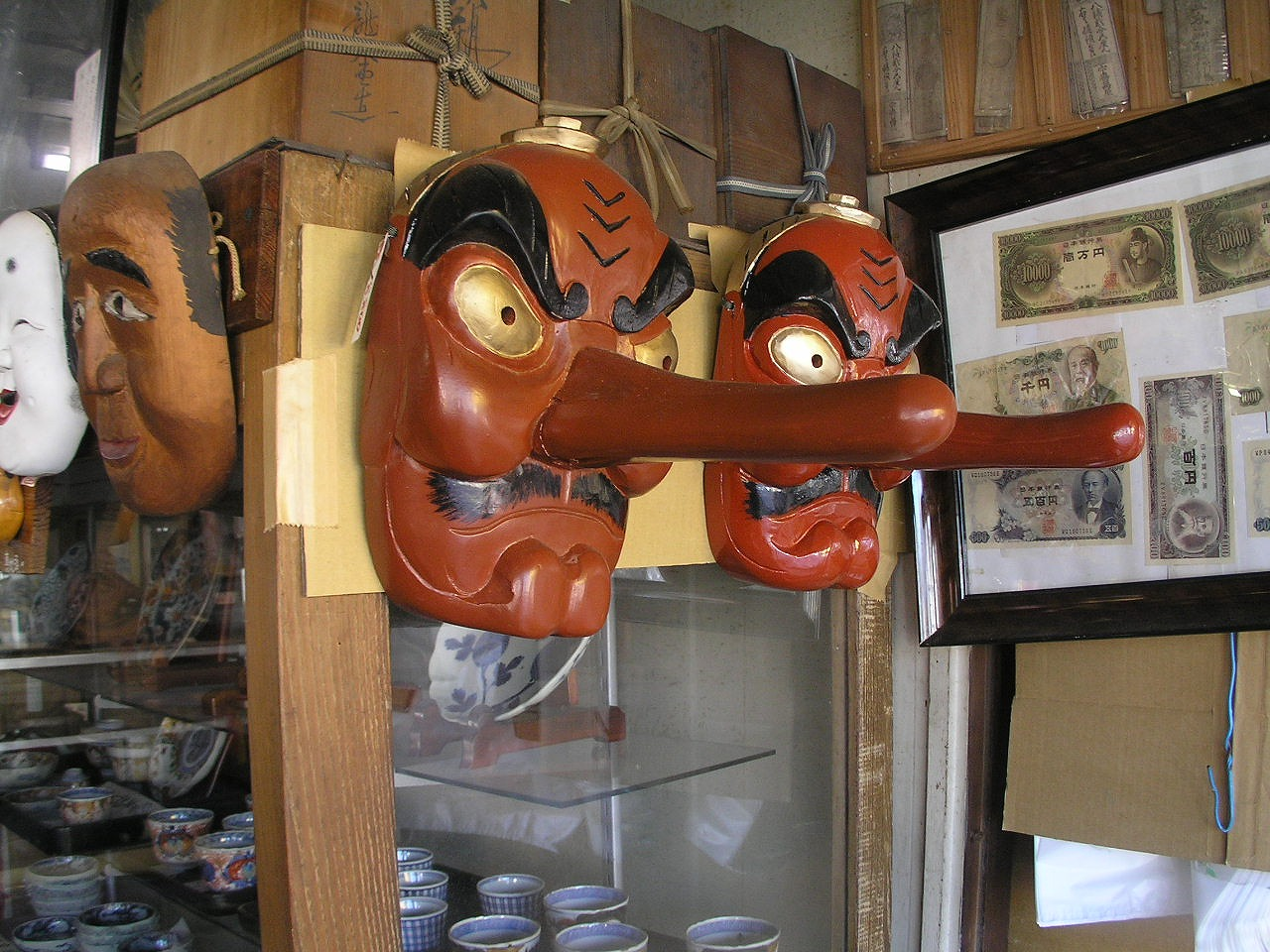
Mask of Tengu

Japanese masks are part of a very old and highly sophisticated and stylized theatrical tradition. Although the roots are in prehistoric myths and cults, they have developed into refined art forms. The oldest masks are the gigaku. The form no longer exists, and was probably a type of dance presentation. The bugaku developed from this – a complex dance-drama that used masks with moveable jaws.

The nō or noh mask evolved from the gigaku and bugaku and are acted entirely by men. The masks are worn throughout very long performances and are consequently very light. The nō mask is the supreme achievement of Japanese mask-making. Nō masks represent gods, men, women, madmen and devils, and each category has many sub-divisions. Kyōgen are short farces with their own masks, and accompany the tragic nō plays. Kabuki is the theatre of modern Japan, rooted in the older forms, but in this form masks are replaced by painted faces.

==== Korea ====
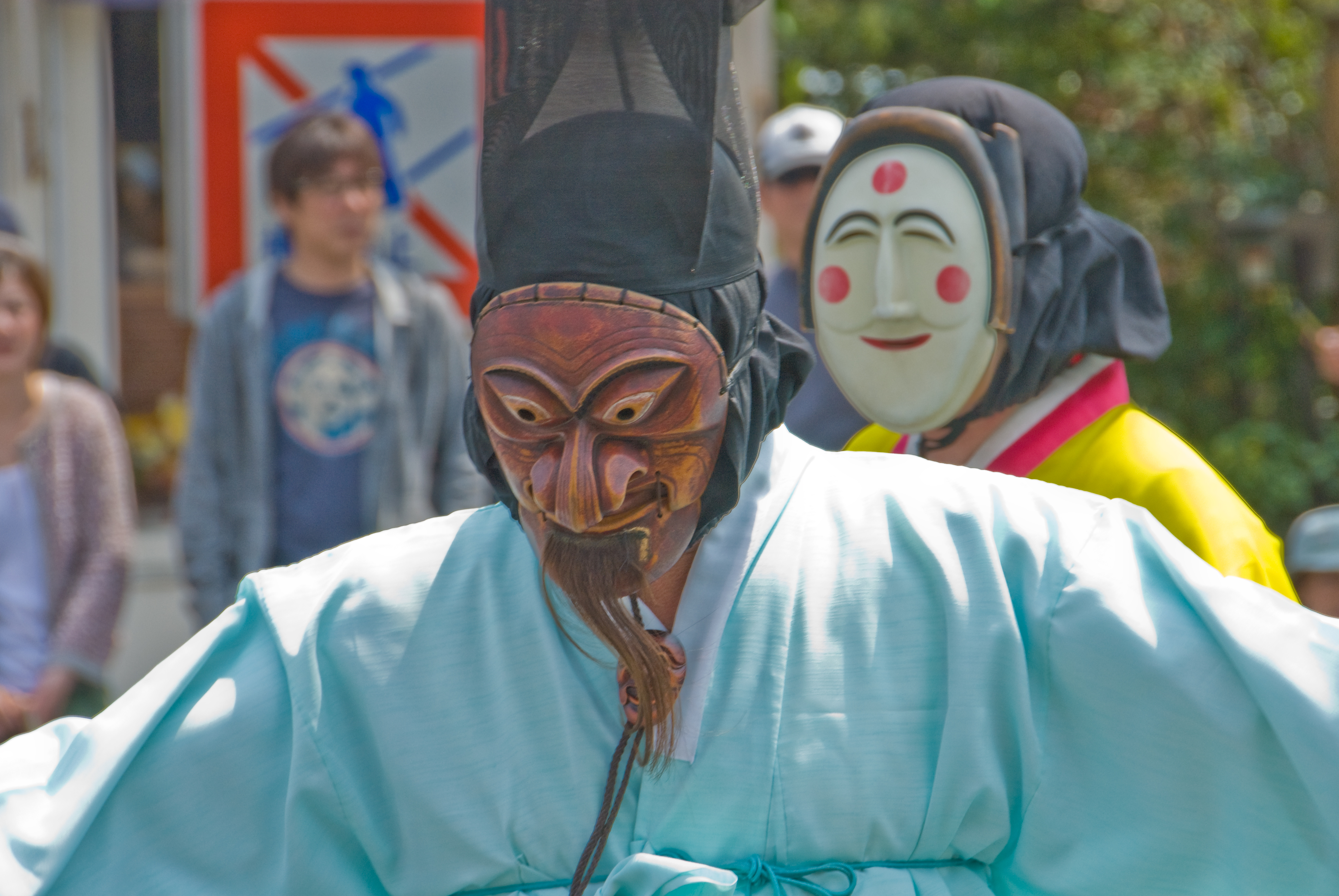
A Korean mask worn by a Talchum performer

Korean masks have a long tradition associated with shamanism and later in ritual dance. Korean masks were used in war, on both soldiers and their horses; ceremonially, for burial rites in jade and bronze and for shamanistic ceremonies to drive away evil spirits; to remember the faces of great historical figures in death masks; and in the arts, particularly in ritual dances, courtly, and theatrical plays. The present uses are as miniature masks for tourist souvenirs, or on mobile phones, where they hang as good-luck talismans.

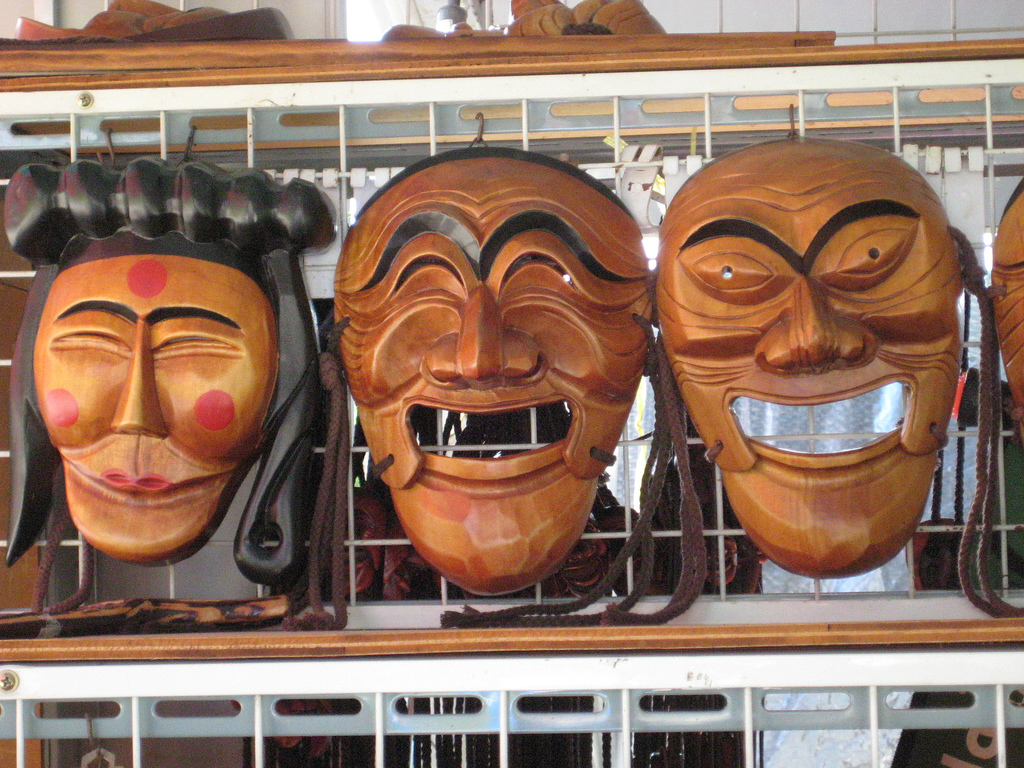
traditional Korean masks, Hahoetal (Kaksi, Yangban and Sonpi)

=== Middle East ===
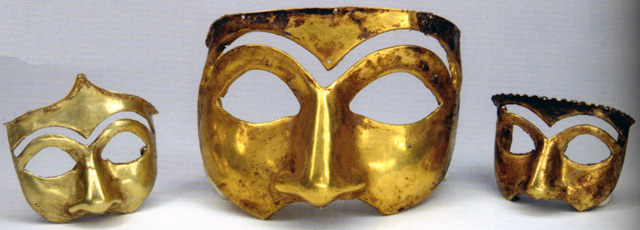
Golden masks excavated from the Kalmakareh Cave in Lorestan, Iran, first half of the first Millennium BC, National Museum of Iran

Theatre in the Middle East, as elsewhere, was initially of a ritual nature, dramatising human relationships with nature, the deities, and other human beings. It grew out of sacred rites of myths and legends performed by priests and lay actors at fixed times and often in fixed locations. Folk theatre – mime, mask, puppetry, farce, juggling – had a ritual context in that it was performed at religious or rites of passage such as days of naming, circumcisions, and marriages. Over time, some of these contextual ritual enactments became divorced from their religious meaning and they were performed throughout the year. Some 2500 years ago, kings and commoners alike were entertained by dance and mime accompanied by music where the dancers often wore masks, a vestige of an earlier era when such dances were enacted as religious rites. According to George Goyan, this practice evoked that of Roman funeral rites where masked actor-dancers represented the deceased with motions and gestures mimicking those of the deceased while singing the praise of their lives (see Masks in Performance above).

=== Europe ===
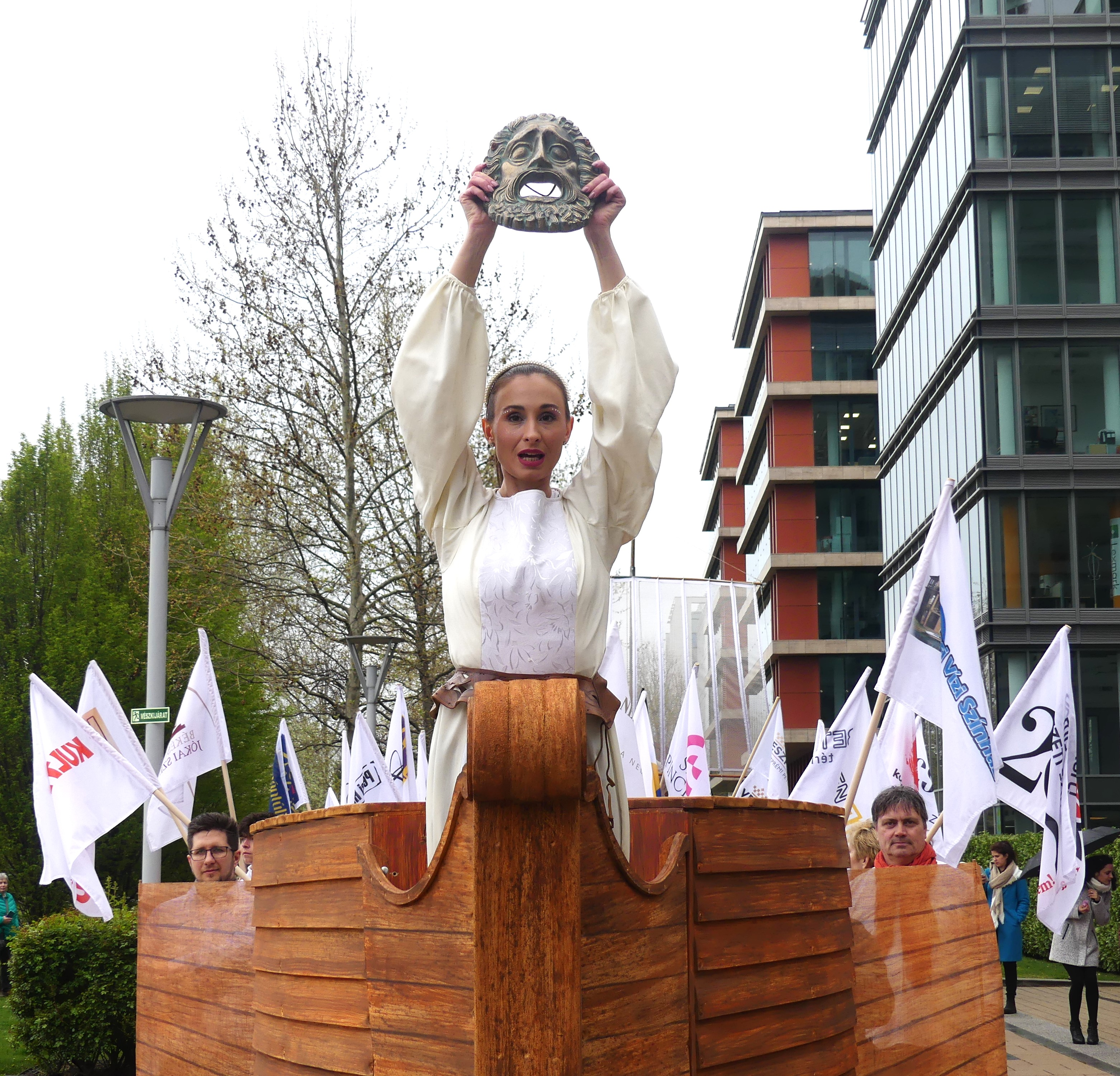
Greek mask

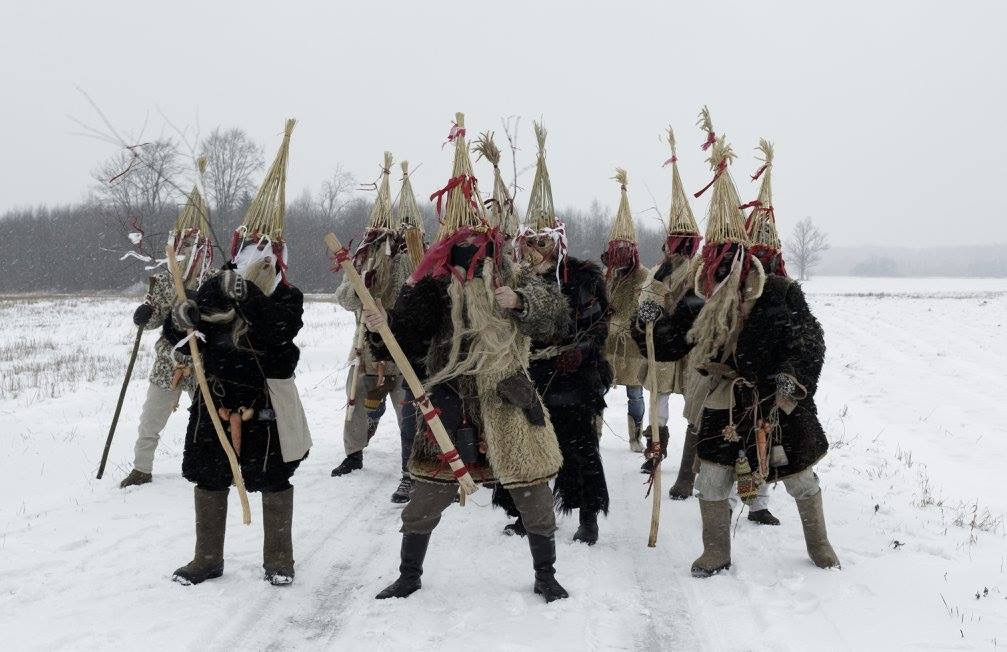
Meteņi mumming group (Budēļi, Buduļi or Būduļi) of Zemgale and Courland regions in Latvia, 2016

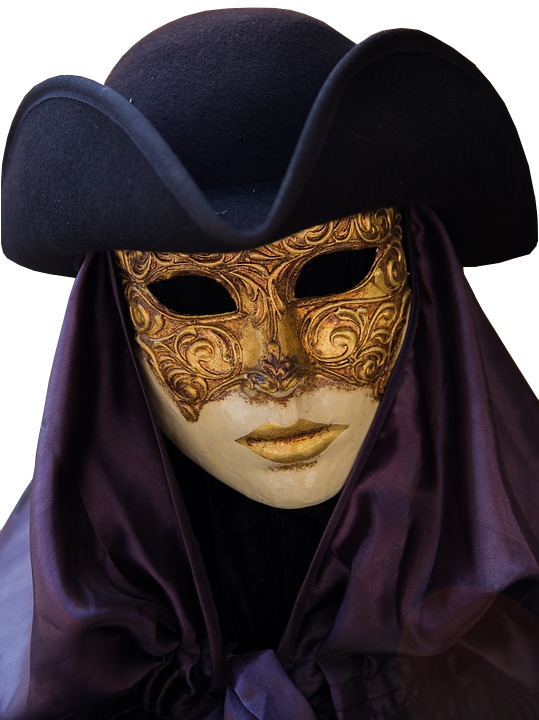
A Venetian carnival mask

The oldest representations of masks in Europe are animal masks, such as the cave paintings of Lascaux in the Dordogne in southern France. Such masks survive in the alpine regions of Austria and Switzerland, and may be connected with hunting or shamanism. Masks are used throughout Europe in modern times, and are frequently integrated into regional folk celebrations and customs. Old masks are preserved and can be seen in museums and other collections, and much research has been undertaken into the historical origins of masks. Most probably represent nature spirits, and as a result many of the associated customs are seasonal. The original significance would have survived only until the introduction of Christianity, which incorporated many of the customs into its own traditions. In that process their meanings were changed also so, for example, old gods and goddesses originally associated with the celebrations were demonised and viewed as mere devils, or were subjugated to the Abrahamic God.

Many of the masks and characters used in European festivals belong to the contrasting categories of the 'good', or 'idealised beauty', set against the 'ugly' or 'beastly' and grotesque. This is particularly true of the Germanic and Central European festivals. Another common type is the Fool, sometimes considered to be the synthesis of the two contrasting types, Handsome and Ugly. Masks also tend to be associated with New Year and Carnival festivals.

The debate about the meaning of these and other mask forms continues in Europe, where monsters, bears, wild men, harlequins, hobby horses, and other fanciful characters appear in carnivals throughout the continent. It is generally accepted that the masks, noise, colour, and clamour are meant to drive away the forces of darkness and winter, and open the way for the spirits of light and the coming of spring. In Sardinia existed the tradition of Mamuthones e Issohadores of Mamoiada; Boes e Merdules of Ottana; Thurpos of Orotelli; S'Urtzu, Su 'Omadore and Sos Mamutzones of Samugheo. The celebration of Giubiana in Canzo (Lombardy) preserves a tradition of masks of anguane, wild man, bear and its hunter, and Giubiana herself, among others.

Another tradition of European masks developed, more self-consciously, from court and civic events, or entertainments managed by guilds and co-fraternities. These grew out of the earlier revels and had become evident by the 15th century in places such as Rome and Venice, where they developed as entertainments to enliven towns and cities. Thus the Maundy Thursday carnival in St. Marks Square in Venice, attended by the Doge and aristocracy, also involved the guilds, including a guild of maskmakers. There is evidence of 'commedia dell'arte'-inspired Venetian masks and by the late 16th century the Venetian Carnival began to reach its peak and eventually lasted a whole 'season' from January until Lent. By the 18th century, it was already a tourist attraction, Goethe saying that he was ugly enough not to need a mask. The carnival was repressed during the Napoleonic Republic, although in the 1980s its costumes and the masks aping the 18th century heyday were revived. It appears other cities in central Europe were influenced by the Venetian model.

During the Reformation, many of these carnival customs began to die out in Protestant regions, although they seem to have survived in Catholic areas despite the opposition of the ecclesiastical authorities. So by the 19th century, the carnivals of the relatively wealthy bourgeois town communities, with elaborate masques and costumes, existed side by side with the ragged and essentially folkloric customs of the rural areas. Although these civic masquerades and their masks may have retained elements drawn from popular culture, the survival of carnival in the 19th century was often a consequence of a self-conscious 'folklore' movement that accompanied the rise of nationalism in many European countries. Nowadays, during carnival in the Netherlands masks are often replaced with face paint for more comfort.

In the beginning of the new century, on 19 August 2004, the Bulgarian archaeologist Georgi Kitov discovered a 673 g gold mask in the burial mound "Svetitsata" near Shipka, Central Bulgaria. It is a very fine piece of workmanship made out of massive 23 karat gold. Unlike other masks discovered in the Balkans (of which three are in Republic of Macedonia and two in Greece), it is now kept in the National Archaeological Museum in Sofia. It is considered to be the mask of a Thracian king, presumably Teres.

== Masks in theatre ==
Masked dancers at a tshechu festival, Bhutan, 2013

Masks play a key part within world theatre traditions. They continue to be a vital force within contemporary theatre, and their usage takes a variety of forms and has often developed from, or continues to be part of old, highly sophisticated, stylized theatrical traditions.

In many cultural traditions, the masked performer is a central concept and is highly valued. In the western tradition, actors in Ancient Greek theatre wore masks, as they do in traditional Japanese Noh drama. In some Greek masks, the wide and open mouth of the mask contained a brass megaphone enabling the voice of the wearer to be projected into the large auditoria. In medieval Europe, masks were used in mystery and miracle plays to portray allegorical creatures, and the performer representing God frequently wore a gold or gilt mask. During the Renaissance, masques and ballet de cour developed – courtly masked entertainments that continued as part of ballet conventions until the late eighteenth century. The masked characters of the Commedia dell'arte included the ancestors of the modern clown. In contemporary western theatre, the mask is often used alongside puppetry to create a theatre that is essentially visual, rather than verbal, and many of its practitioners have been visual artists.

=== Contemporary theatre ===
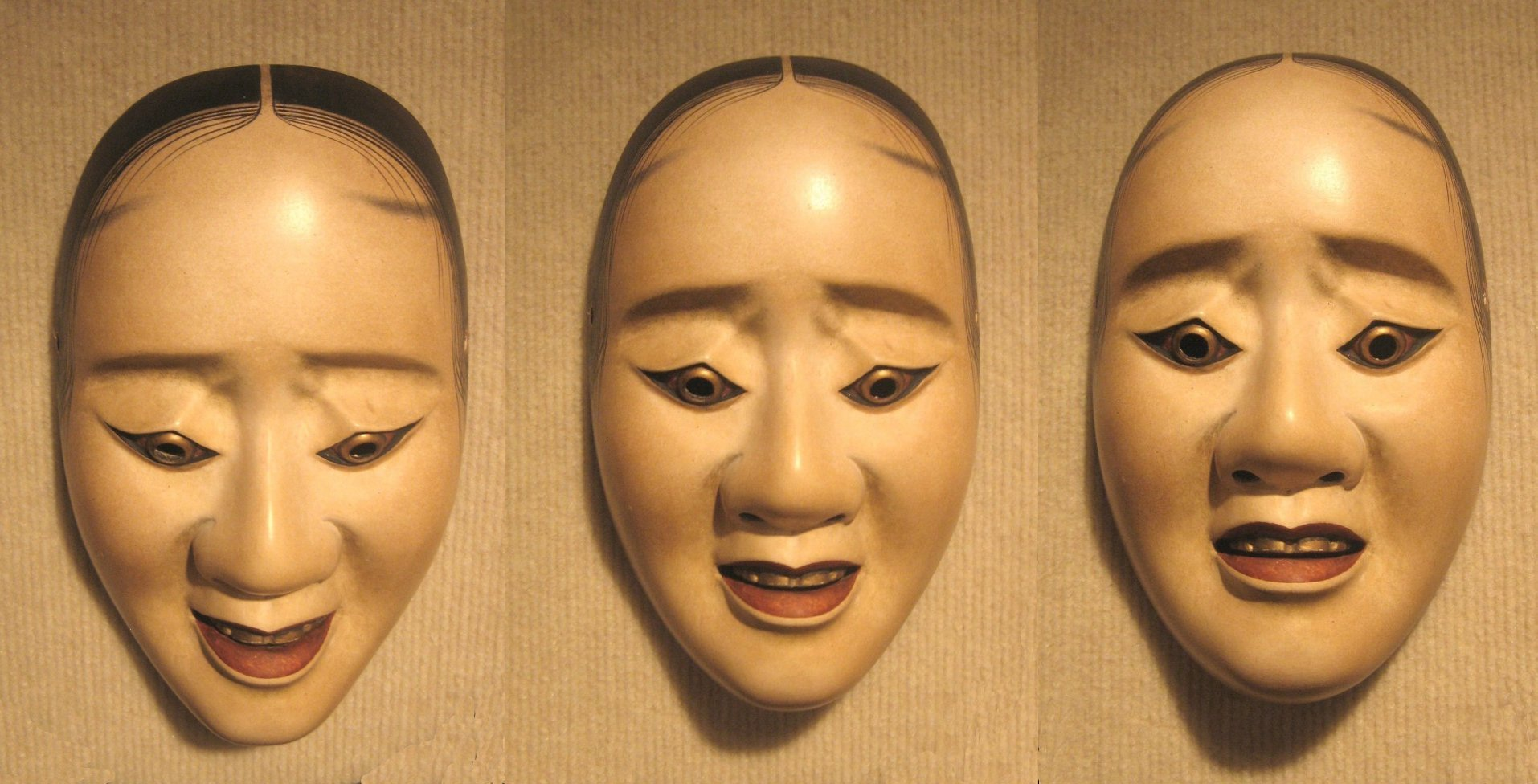
Three photographs of the same noh mask of a woman show how her expression appears to change with a tilting of the performer's head. To demonstrate this effect, the mask was affixed to a wall with constant lighting and only the camera was moved.

Masks and puppets were often incorporated into the theatre work of European avant-garde artists from the turn of the nineteenth century. Alfred Jarry, Pablo Picasso, Oskar Schlemmer, other artists of the Bauhaus School, as well as surrealists and Dadaists, experimented with theatre forms and masks in their work.

In the 20th century, many theatre practitioners, such as Meyerhold, Edward Gordon Craig, Jacques Copeau, and others in their lineage, attempted to move away from Naturalism. They turned to sources such as Oriental Theatre (particularly Japanese Noh theatre) and commedia dell'arte, both of which forms feature masks prominently.

Edward Gordon Craig (1872–1966) in A Note on Masks (1910) proposed the virtues of using masks over the naturalism of the actor. Craig was highly influential, and his ideas were taken up by Brecht, Cocteau, Genet, Eugene O'Neill – and later by Arden, Grotowski, Brook, and others who "attempted to restore a ritualistic if not actually religious significance to theatre".

Copeau, in his attempts to "Naturalise" actors, decided to use masks to liberate them from their "excessive awkwardness". In turn, Copeau's work with masks was taken on by his students including Etienne Decroux and later, via Jean Daste and Jacques Lecoq. Lecoq, having worked as movement director at Teatro Piccalo in Italy, was influenced by the Commedia tradition. Lecoq met Amleto Satori, a sculptor, and they collaborated on reviving the techniques of making traditional leather Commedia masks. Later, developing Copeau's "noble mask", Lecoq would ask Satori to make him masques neutre (the neutral mask). For Lecoq, masks became an important training tool, the neutral mask being designed to facilitate a state of openness in the student-performers, moving gradually on to character and expressive masks, and finally to "the smallest mask in the world" the clown's red-nose. One highly important feature of Lecoq's use of mask, wasn't so much its visual impact on stage, but how it changed the performers movement on stage. It was a body-based approach to mask work, rather than a visually led one. Lecoq's pedagogy has been hugely influential for theatre practitioners in Europe working with mask and has been exported widely across the world. This work with masks also relates to performing with portable structures and puppetry. Students of Lecoq have continued using masks in their work after leaving the school, such as in John Wright's Trestle Theatre.

In America, mask-work was slower to arrive, but the Guerrilla Theatre movement, typified by groups such as the San Francisco Mime Troupe and Bread and Puppet Theatre took advantage of it. Influenced by modern dance, modern mime, Commedia dell'arte and Brecht such groups took to the streets to perform highly political theatre. Peter Schumann, the founder of Bread and Puppet theatre, made particular use of German Carnival masks. Bread and Puppet inspired other practitioners around the world, many of whom used masks in their work. In the US and Canada, these companies include In the Heart of the Beast Puppet and Mask Theater of Minneapolis; Arm-of-the-Sea Theatre from New York State; Snake Theater from California; and Shadowland Theatre of Toronto, Ontario. These companies, and others, have a strong social agenda, and combine masks, music and puppetry to create a visual theatrical form. Another route masks took into American Theatre was via dancer/choreographers such as Mary Wigman, who had been using masks in dance and had emigrated to America to flee the Nazi regime.

In Europe, Schumann's influence combined with the early avant-garde artists to encourage groups such as Moving Picture Mime Show and Welfare State (both in the UK). These companies had a big influence on the next generation of groups working in visual theatre, including IOU and Horse and Bamboo Theatre, who create a theatre in which masks are used along with puppets, film and other visual forms, with an emphasis on the narrative structure.

== Functional masks ==
Masks are also familiar as pieces of kit associated with practical functions, usually protective, including in sports and during plagues:

=== Medical ===
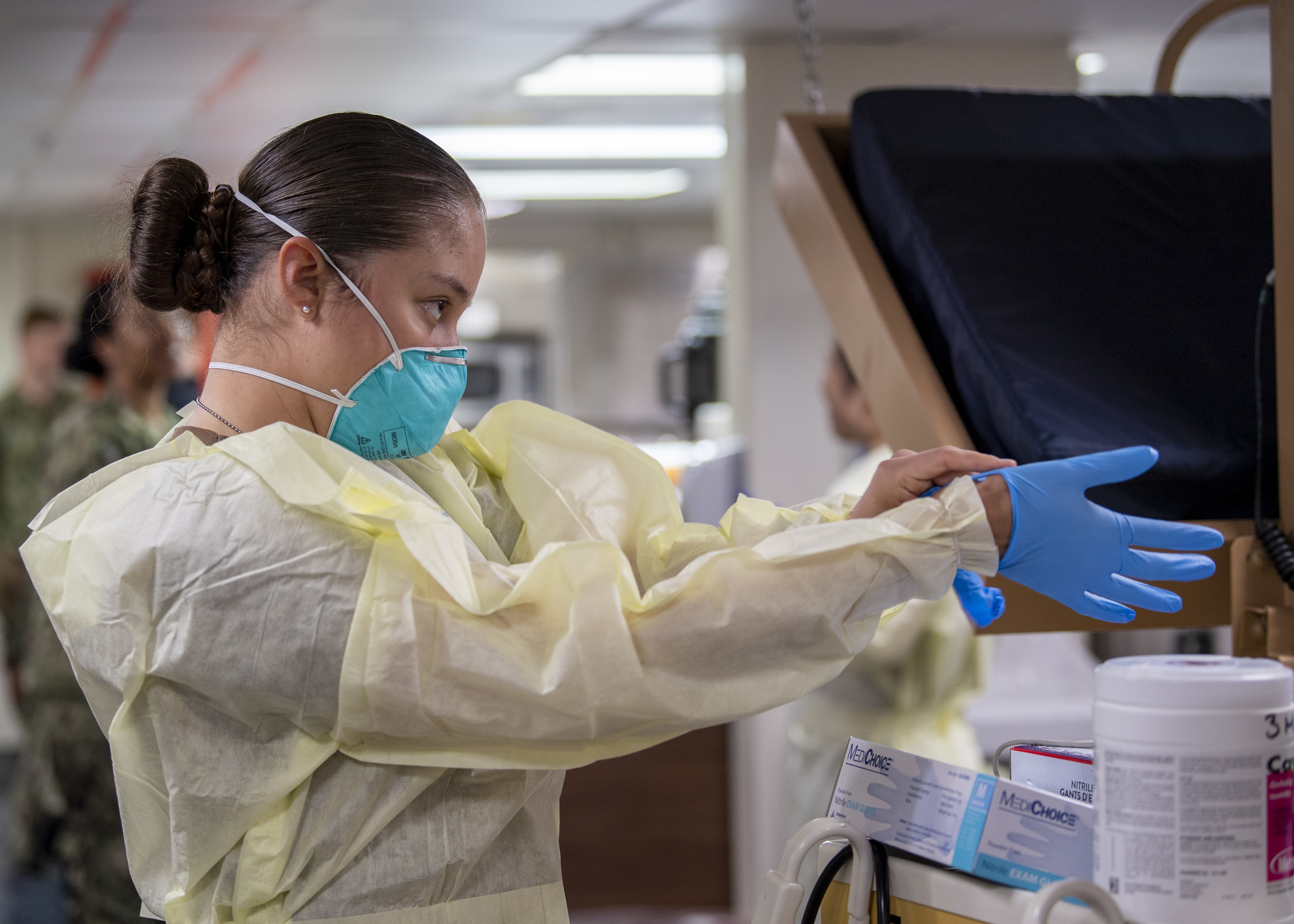
A person dons PPE and a surgical N95 in a hospital

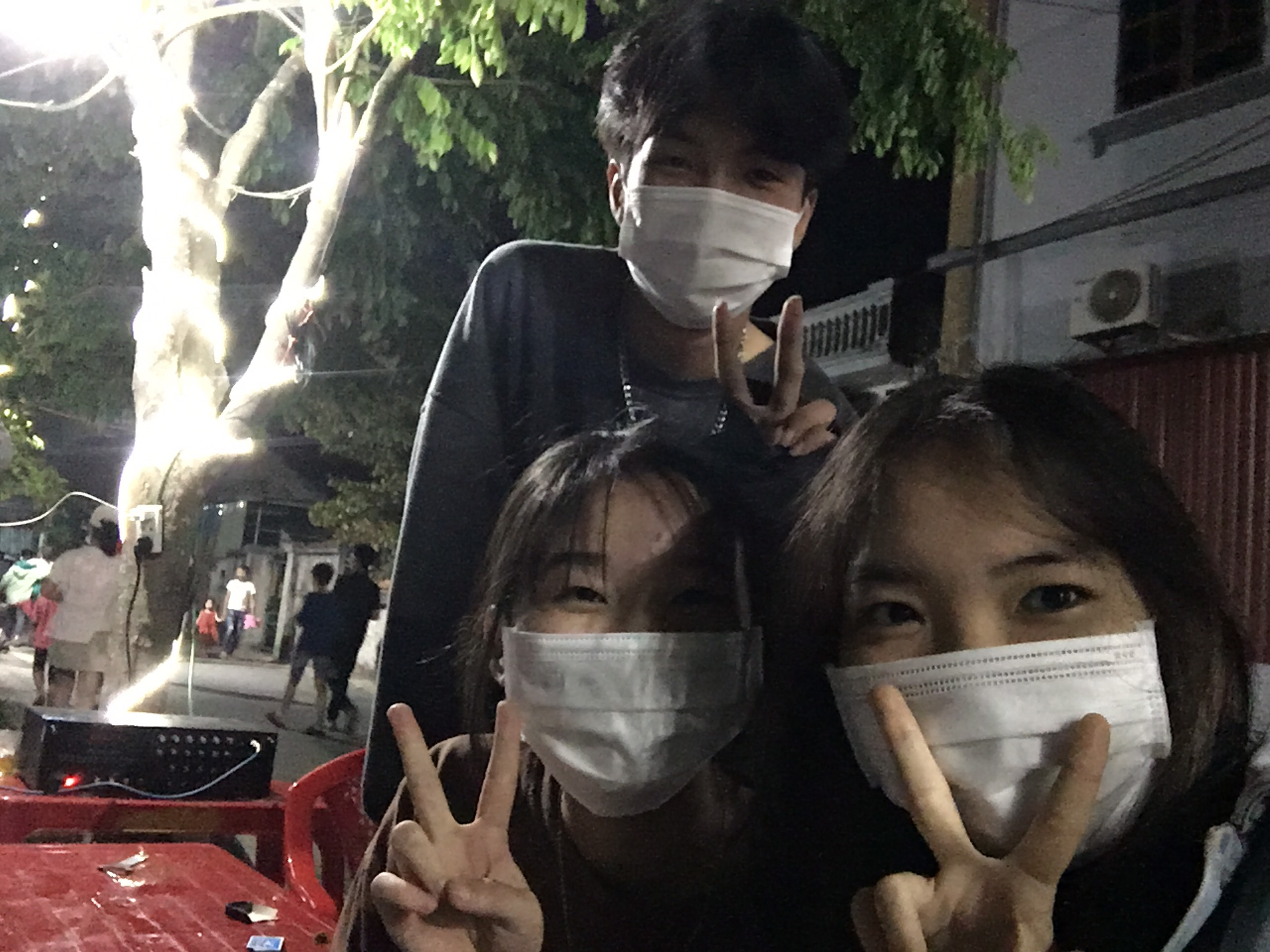
Vietnamese youth wear face masks during the COVID-19 pandemic

Some masks are used for medical purposes:

- N95 respirator, used for the prevention of tuberculosis and other pathogens
  - FFP2, European equivalent
- Oxygen mask, a piece of medical equipment that assists breathing.
- Anesthetic mask.
- Burn mask, a piece of medical equipment that protects the burn tissue from contact with other surfaces, and minimises the risk of infection.
- Surgical mask, a tool for respiratory source control.
- Face shield, to protect a medical professional from bodily fluids.
- Pocket mask or CPR mask, used to safely deliver rescue breaths during a cardiac arrest or respiratory arrest.
- Cloth face mask, an alternative to respirators and surgical masks during shortages.

=== Protective ===
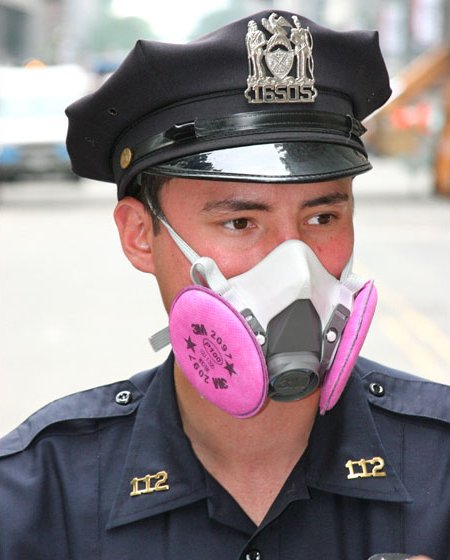
Protective reusable filter mask worn by NYPD officer

Protective masks are pieces of kit or equipment worn on the head and face to afford protection to the wearer, and today usually have these functions:

- Providing a supply of air or filtering the outside air (respirators and dust masks).
- Protecting the face against flying objects or dangerous environments, while allowing vision.

In Roman gladiatorial tournaments masks were sometimes used. From archaeological evidence it is clear that these were not only protective but also helped make the wearer appear more intimidating. In medieval Europe and in Japan soldiers and samurai wore similarly ferocious-looking protective armour, extending to face-masks.

In the 16th century, the Visard was worn by women to protect from sunburn. Today this function is attributed to thin balaclavas.

In sport the protective mask will often have a secondary function to make the wearer appear more impressive as a competitor.

Before strong transparent materials such as polycarbonate were invented, visors to protect the face had to be opaque with small eyeslits, and were a sort of mask, as often in mediaeval suits of armour, and (for example) Old Norse grímr meant "mask or visor".

=== Disguise ===
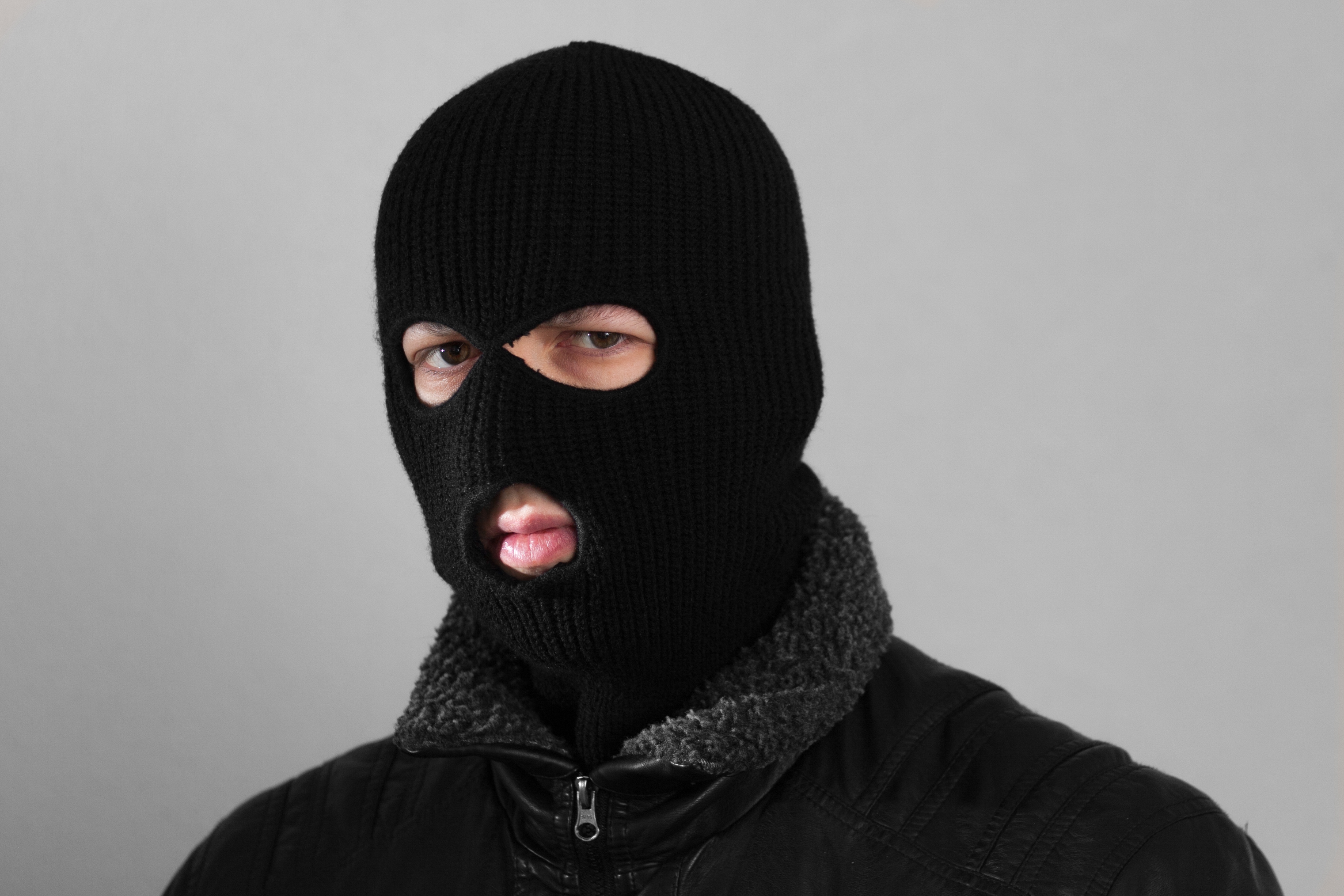
A rib knit three-hole balaclava allows the wearer to protect the face against cold air or hinder recognition

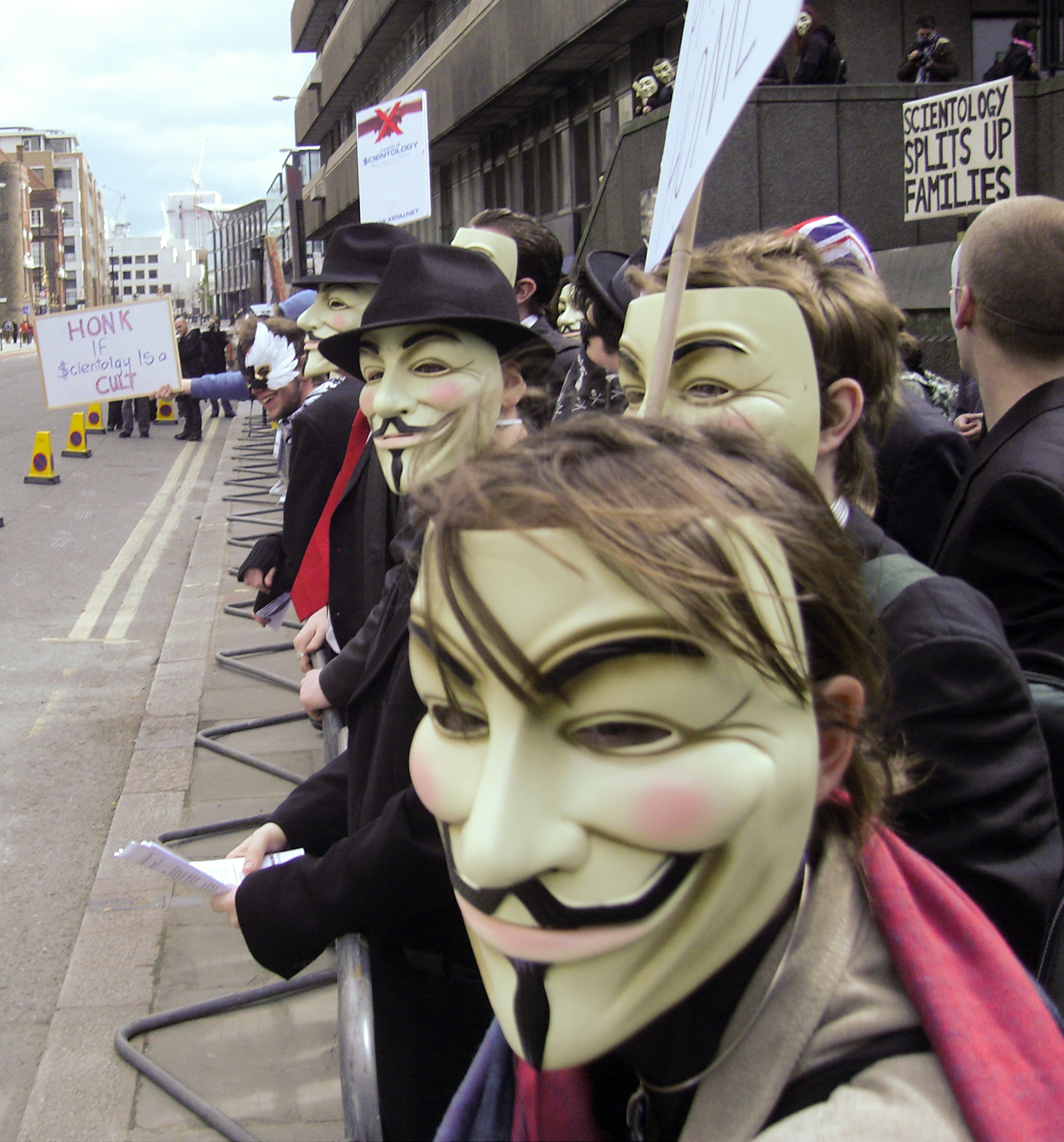
Members of Anonymous wear Guy Fawkes masks while protesting against the Church of Scientology, 2008, London

Masks are sometimes used to avoid recognition. As a disguise, the mask acts as a form of protection for the wearer who wishes to assume a role or task without being identified by others.

- Robbers and other criminal perpetrators may wear masks as a means of concealing their faces and thus their identities from their victims and from law enforcement.
- Law enforcement under some authoritarian governments have a history of wearing masks, while in Mexico and France, their use is more selective. In March 2025, U.S. Immigration and Customs Enforcement (ICE) law enforcement officers began wearing masks, purportedly to protect them and their families from doxing. Liberal think tanks, such as the Center for American Progress, have alleged that ICE agents began masking in order to stoke fear within immigrant communities.
- Occasionally, a witness for the prosecution appears in court in a mask to avoid being recognized by associates of the accused.
- Participants in a black bloc at protests usually wear masks, often bandannas, to avoid recognition, and to try to protect against any riot control agents used.
- In fiction, superheroes and supervillains often wear masks or cowls for protection and to brand themselves.

Masks are also used to prevent recognition while showing membership of a group:

- Masks are used by penitents in ceremonies to disguise their identity in order to make the act of penitence more selfless. The Semana Santa parades throughout Spain and in Hispanic or Catholic countries worldwide are examples of this, with their cone-shaped masks known as capirote.
- Masks are used by vigilante groups.
- The cone-shaped mask in particular is identified with the Ku Klux Klan in a self-conscious effort to combine the hiding of personal identity with the promotion of a powerful and intimidating image.
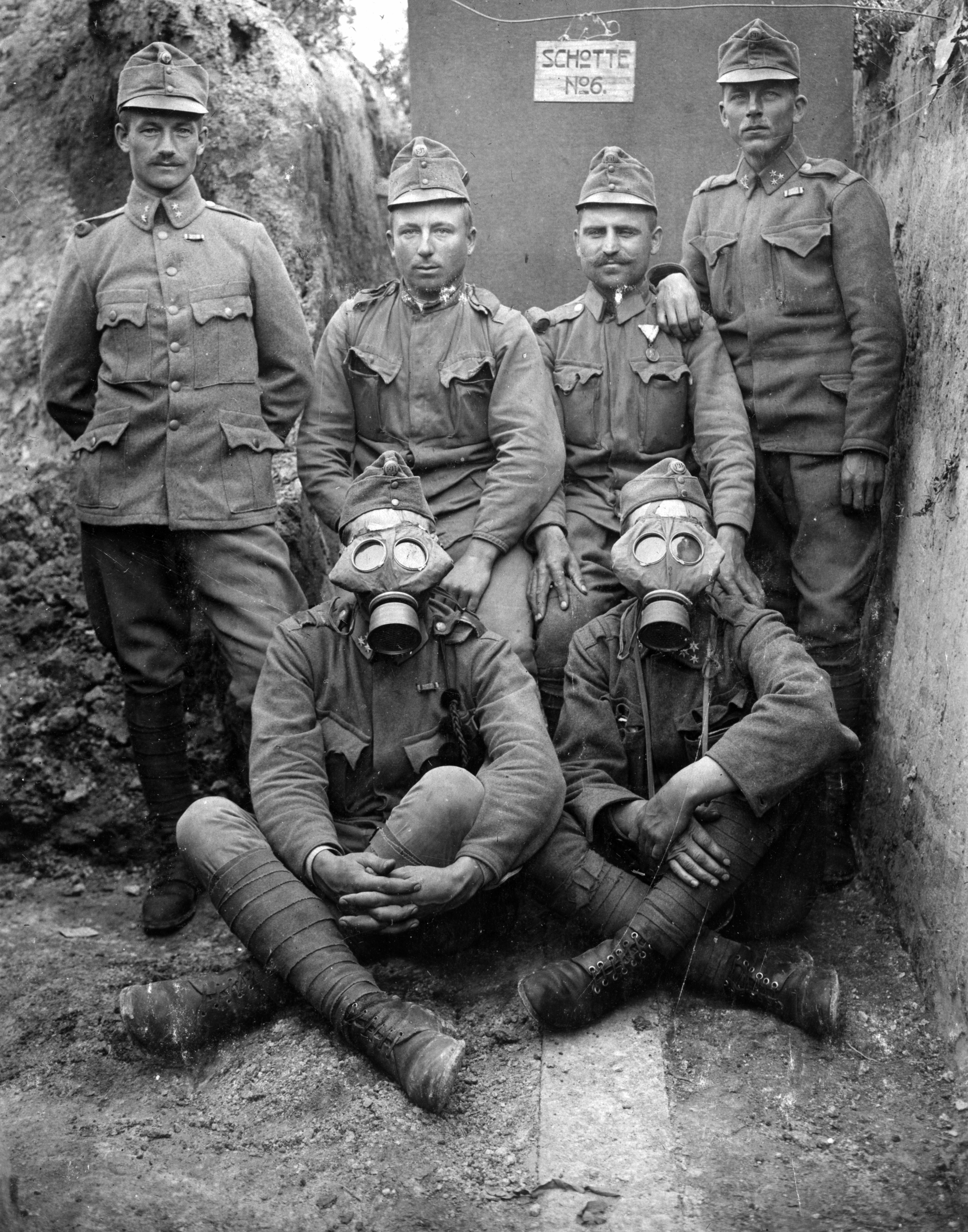
- Gas masks were a common defensive measure against chemical warfare during World War 1.
  Members of the group Anonymous frequently wear masks (usually Guy Fawkes masks, best known from V for Vendetta) when they attend protests.

While the niqāb usually shows membership of some Islamic community, its purpose is not to hinder recognition, although it falls under some anti-mask laws such as the French ban on face covering.

=== Occupational ===
- Beaked masks containing herbs in the beak were worn in early modern Europe by plague doctors to try to ward off the Black Death.
- Filter mask, a piece of safety equipment.
- Full-face diving mask as part of self-contained breathing apparatus for divers and others; some let the wearer talk to others through a built-in communication device
- Respirator (gas or particulate mask), a mask worn on the face to protect the body from airborne pollutants and toxic materials, and fine particulate matter or infectious particles.
- Oxygen mask worn by high-altitude pilots, or used in medicine to deliver oxygen, anesthetic, or other gases to patients
- Welding mask to protect the welder's face and eyes from the brightness and sparks created during welding

=== Sports ===
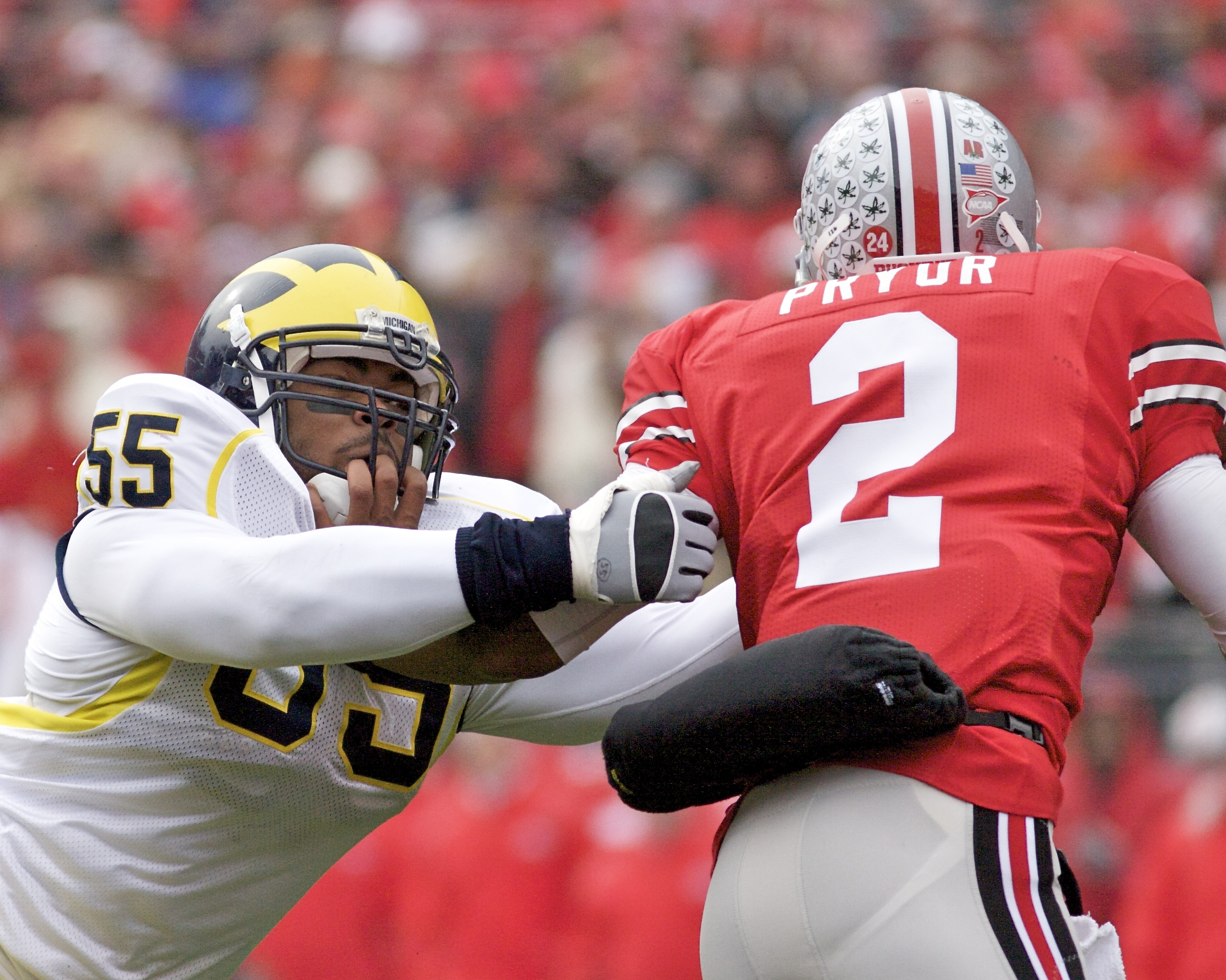
An American football player wearing a mask that protects his face from another player's hand

- American football helmet face mask
- Balaclava, also known as a "ski mask", to protect the face against cold air.
- Baseball catcher's mask.
- Diving mask, an item of diving equipment that allows scuba divers, free-divers, and snorkelers to see clearly underwater.
- Fencing mask.
- Goaltender mask, a mask worn by an ice or field hockey goaltender to protect the head and face from injury.
- Hurling helmets were made mandatory in 2010, and have a wire mask on the front to protect the player's face.
- Kendo, a mask called Men is used in this Japanese sword-fighting martial art.
- Paintball mask.
- Visor (ice hockey).

An interesting example of a sports mask that confounds the protective function is the wrestling mask, a mask most widely used in the Mexican/Latin lucha libre style of wrestling. In modern lucha libre, masks are colourfully designed to evoke the images of animals, gods, ancient heroes, and other archetypes. The mask is considered "sacred" to some degree, placing its role closer to the ritual and performance function.

== Punitive ==
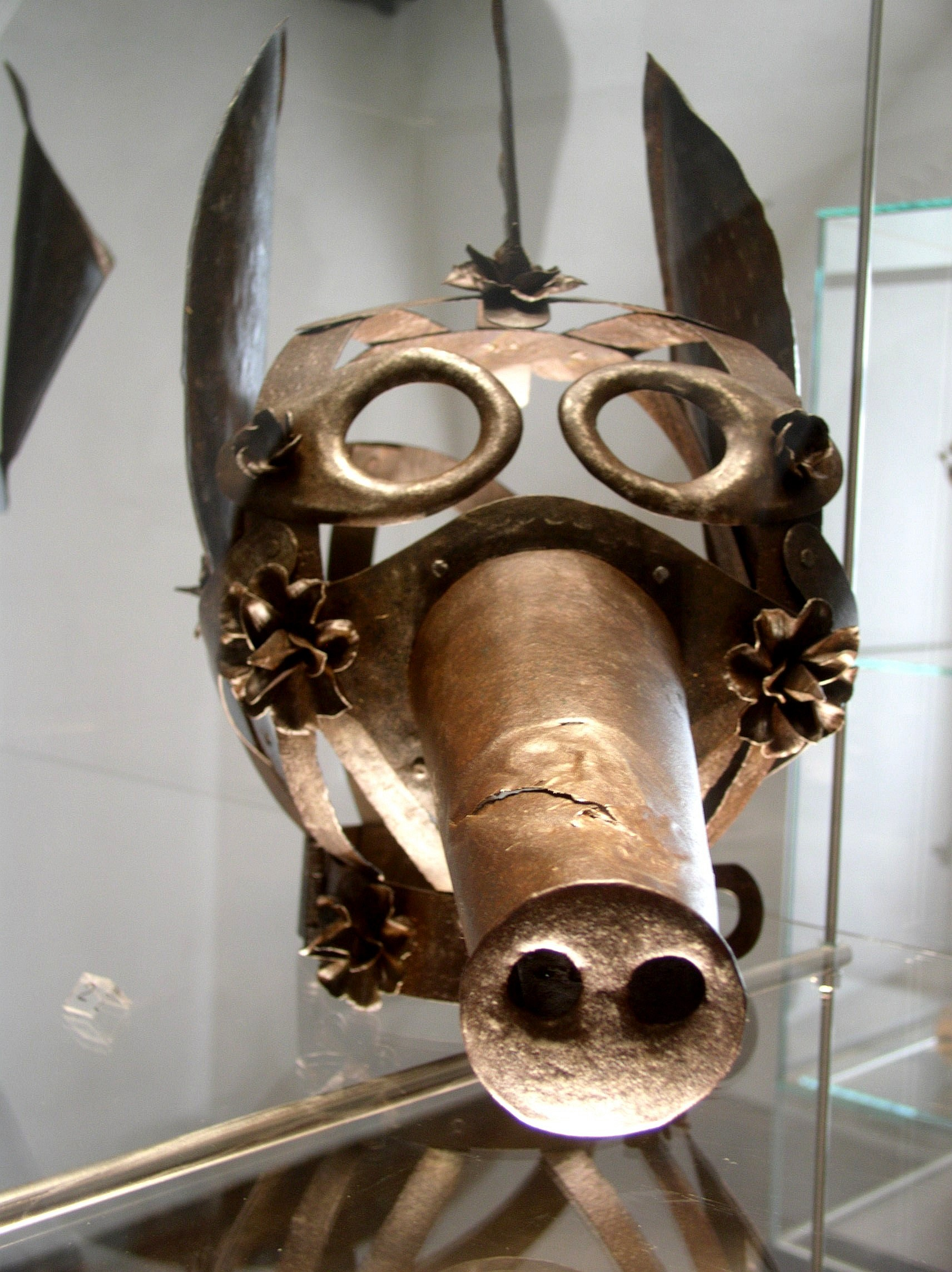
A medieval "Mask of Shame"

Masks are sometimes used to punish the wearer either by signalling their humiliation or causing direct suffering:

- A particularly uncomfortable iron mask in 16th to 19th-century Scotland and England was the scold's bridle, designed to publicly humiliate and silence women deemed as "scolds" by restraining their tongues with a metal plate, often leading to physical pain and social ridicule as they were paraded through town.
- The schandmaske, or shame mask, used in 17th-century Germany, served as a public punishment for social transgressions, designed to symbolize the crime and humiliate the wearer, stripping them of identity while locking them into a role that exposed them to community scorn.
- Masks called "silence masks" or "calico hoods" were used to alienate and silence prisoners in late 19th-century Australian jails such as the Old Melbourne Gaol in Melbourne, Victoria. They were made of white cloth and covered the face, leaving only the eyes visible.
- A bondage hood has been associated with fetishism in BDSM practices with punitive measures aimed at humiliation and control, reflecting a dual role in punishment and erotic expression.

== Fashion ==
Decorative masks may be worn as part of a costume outside of ritual, ceremonial, or historic masque entertainment. Often inspired by masquerade ball and carnival styles, attendees at costume or carnival parties frequently wear masks to enhance their costumes.

Several artists in the 20th and 21st centuries, such as Isamaya Ffrench and Damselfrau, create masks as wearable art, bridging the gap between traditional masks and modern design.

Wrestling masks are predominantly used in Mexican and Japanese wrestling, where they are intricately linked to a wrestler's persona. For example, a wrestler known as 'The Panda' might wear a mask with a panda's markings. In these cultures, wrestlers often wager their masks in matches against, for example, other wrestlers' masks, titles, or opponents' hair. By contrast, masks are viewed less favorably in the United States and Canadian wrestling culture.

Several metal bands and performers, notably members of the groups Slipknot, Gwar, and the guitarist Buckethead, wear masks when they perform on stage. Several other bands, including Kiss, Alice Cooper, and Dimmu Borgir simulate the effect with face paint, with some like Urgehal, in a style called corpse paint. Hollywood Undead also wears masks, although they often remove them during a performance.

Steampunk fashion involves mask-making techniques including leather-working, to create artisanal gas masks.

In avant-garde haute couture, Belgian designer Martin Margiela developed his first masked looks in the 1990s. Masks became a hallmark of his collection and were carried on at that Parisian fashion house by subsequent designer Matthieu Blazy, who joined Maison Margiela in 2011. Wearing their masks during his Yeezus Tour, musician Kanye West raised their global popularity. Designer John Galliano took over Margiela in 2014, adding sculptural and theatrical qualities to the look; and since 2025, Glenn Martens has reinforced Margiela's aesthetic.

== In works of fiction ==
Masks have been used in many horror films to conceal the identities of the killer. Notable examples include Jason Voorhees of the Friday the 13th series, Jigsaw Killer from Saw, Ghostface of the Scream series, and Michael Myers of the Halloween series.

== Other types ==
- A "buccal mask" is a mask that covers only the cheeks (hence the adjective "buccal") and mouth.
- A death mask is a mask either cast from or applied to the face of a recently deceased person.
- A "facial" (short for facial mask) is a temporary mask, not solid, used in cosmetics or as therapy for skin treatment.
- A "life mask" is a plaster cast of a face, used as a model for making a painting or sculpture.
- An animal roleplay mask is used for people to create a more animal-like image in fetish role play.
- A variety of technologies attempt to fool facial recognition software by the use of anti-facial recognition masks.

== Gallery ==
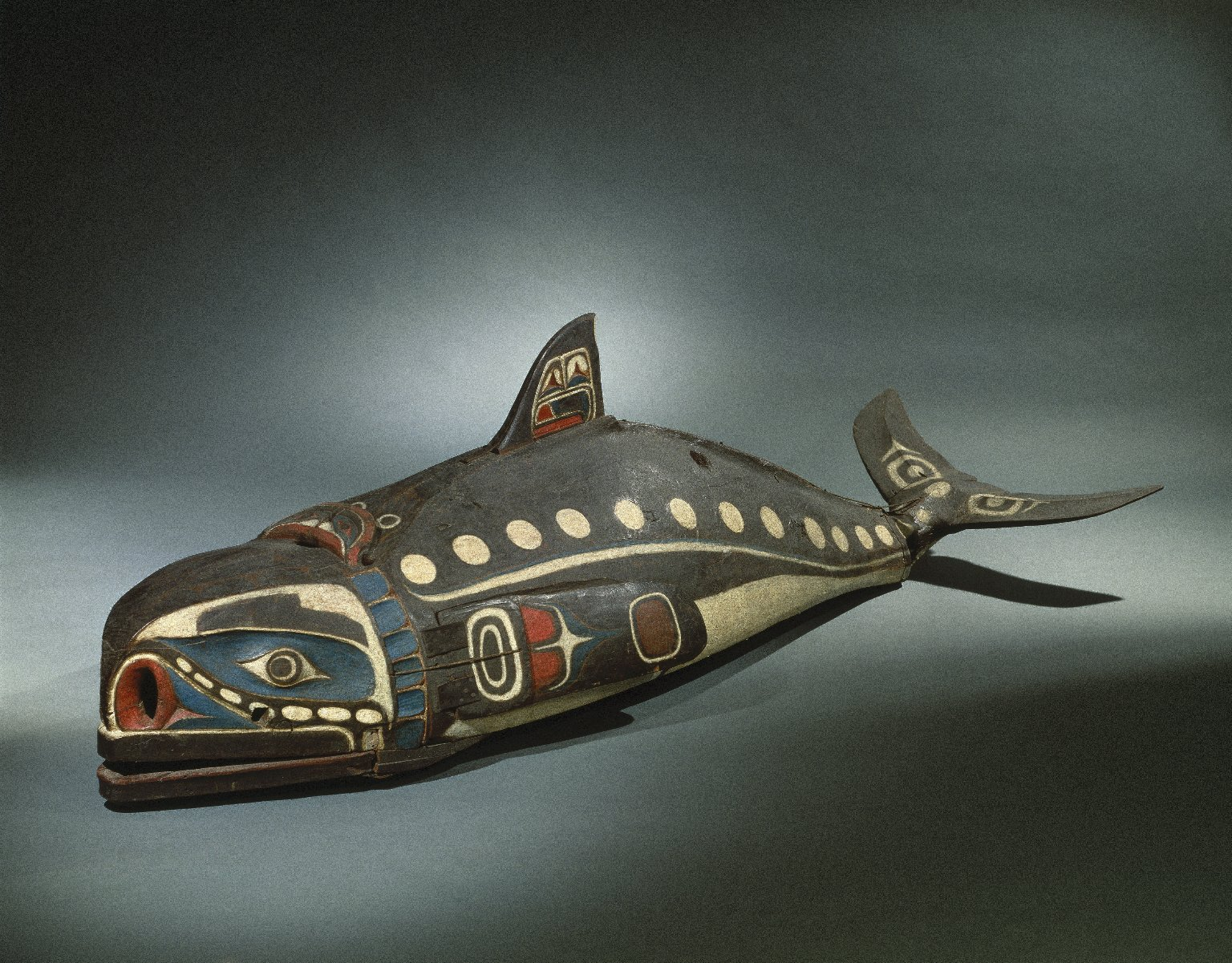
Kwakwaka'wakw, Baleen Whale Mask, 19th century, Brooklyn Museum

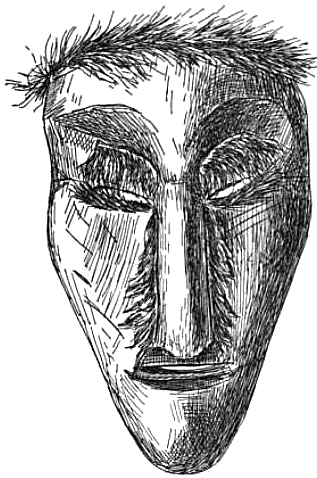
A Cherokee ceremonial mask made of wood

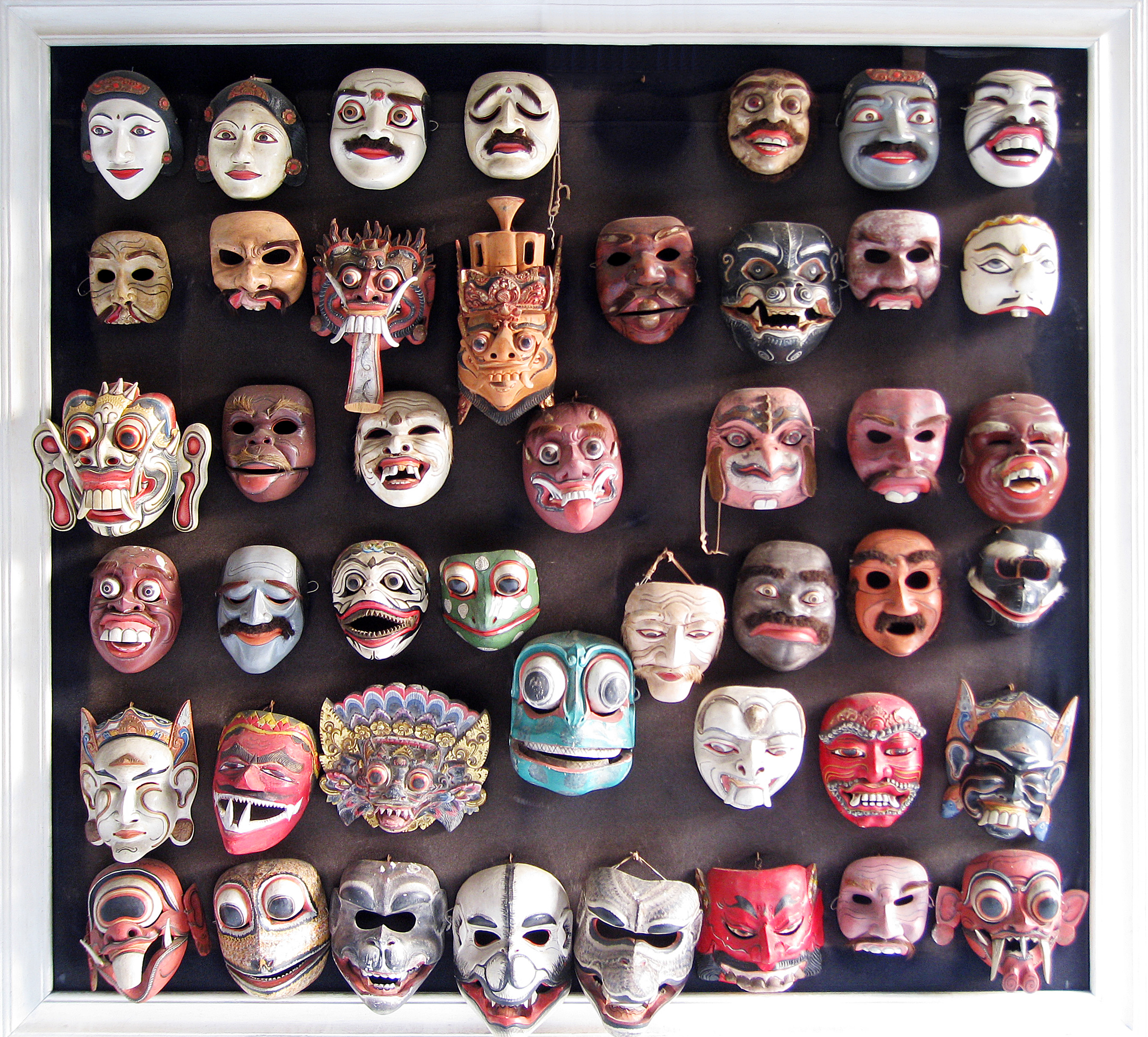
Various Balinese topeng dance masks

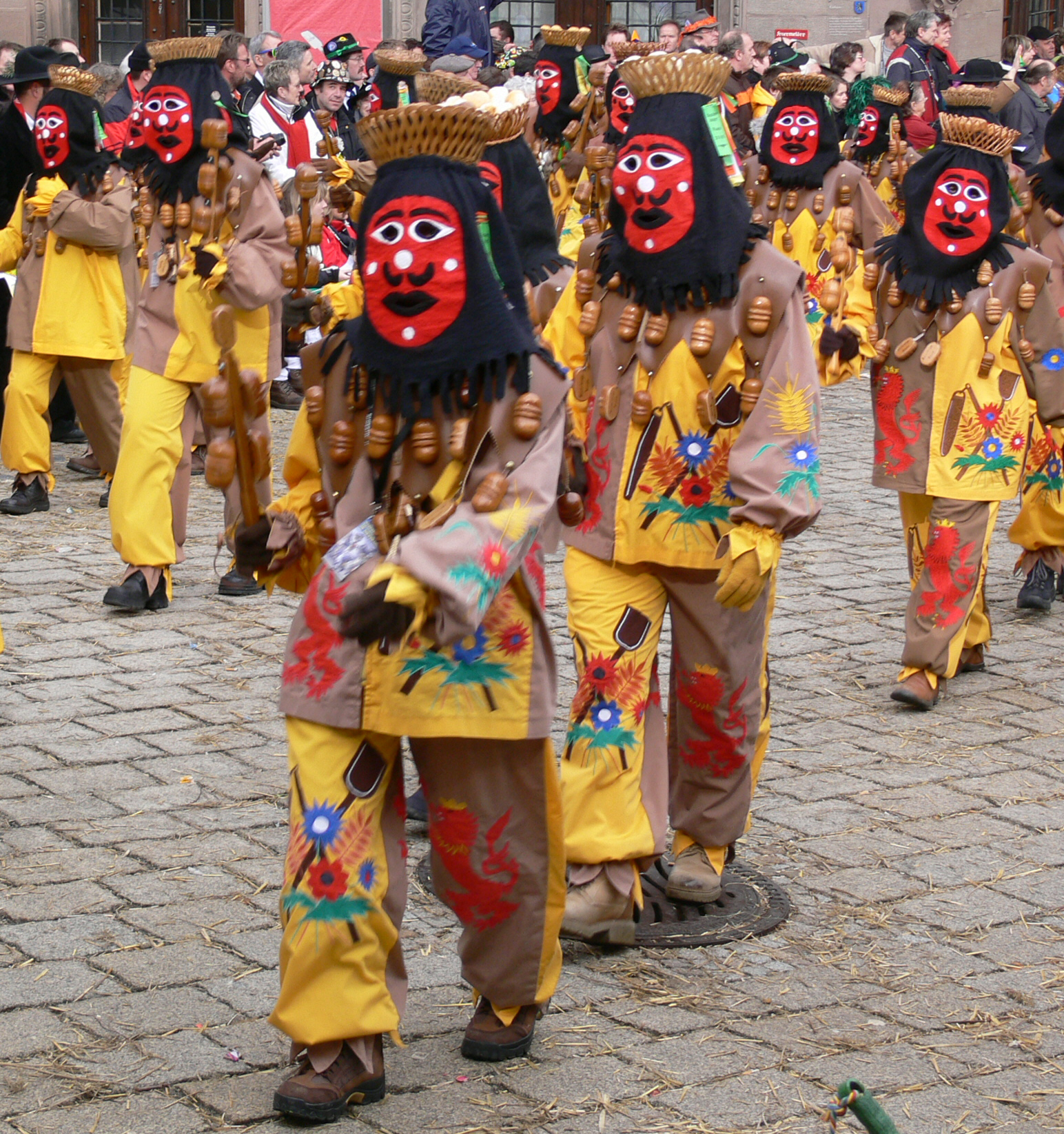
Fools Meeting or Parade, Meßkirch, Germany

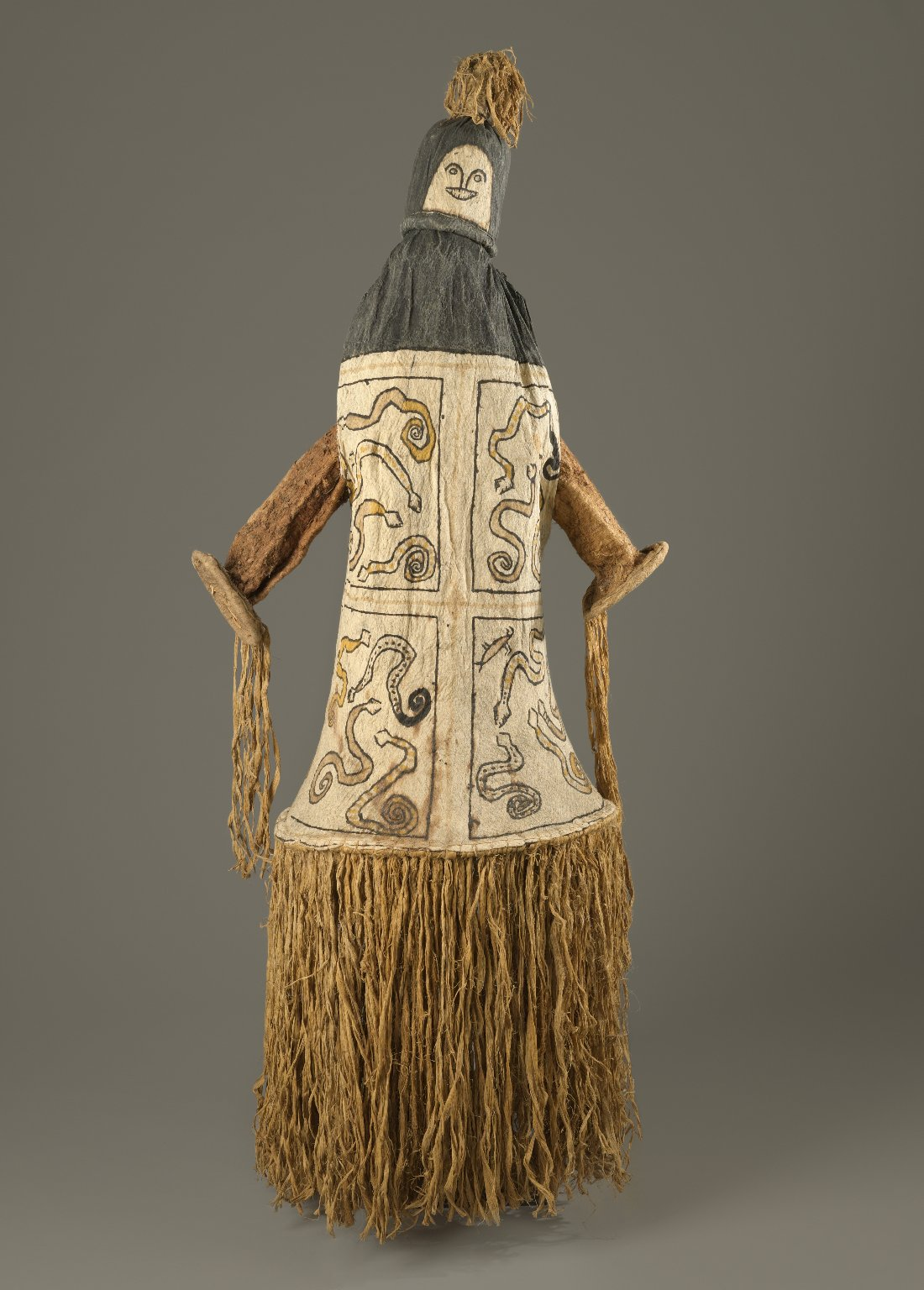
Dance Mask (Takü), 20th century, Brooklyn Museum. These full-body masks are worn for the mourning, or ónyo ("weeping") ceremony, a multi-day ritual held approximately a year after an individual's death.

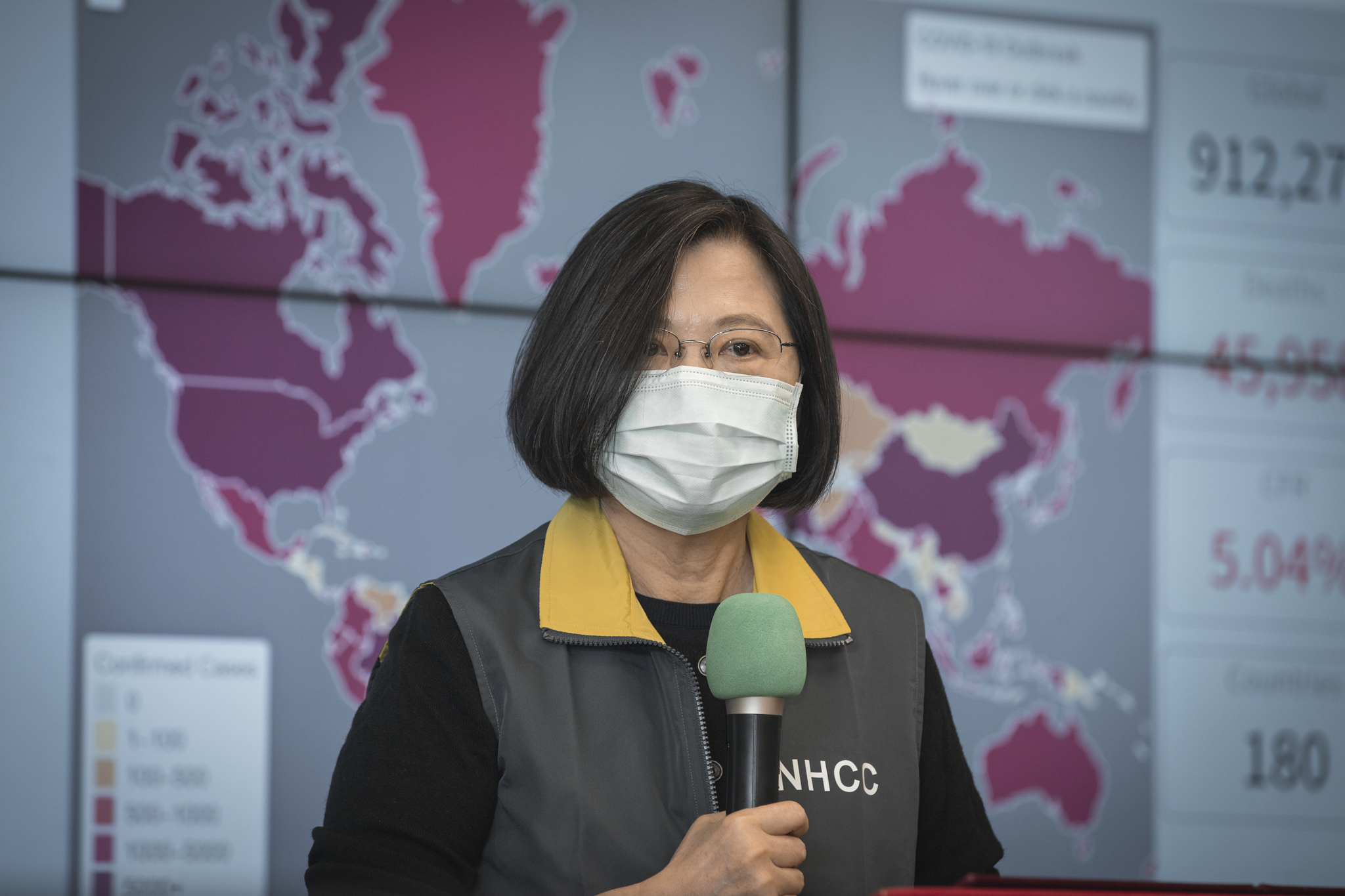
Taiwanese President Tsai Ing-wen wearing a surgical mask during the COVID-19 pandemic

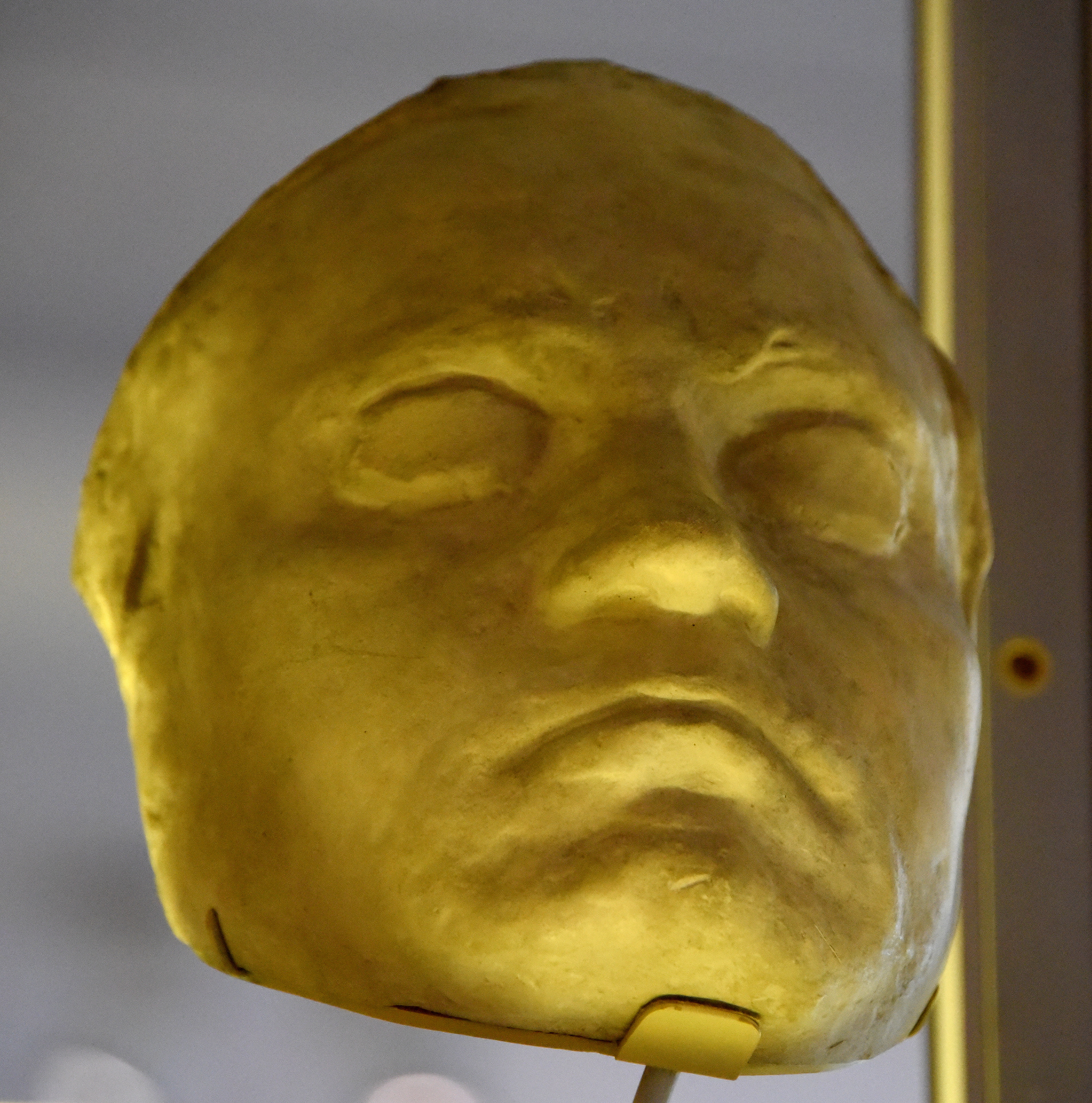
Life mask of Ludwig van Beethoven, c. 1812. The Wellcome Collection, London.

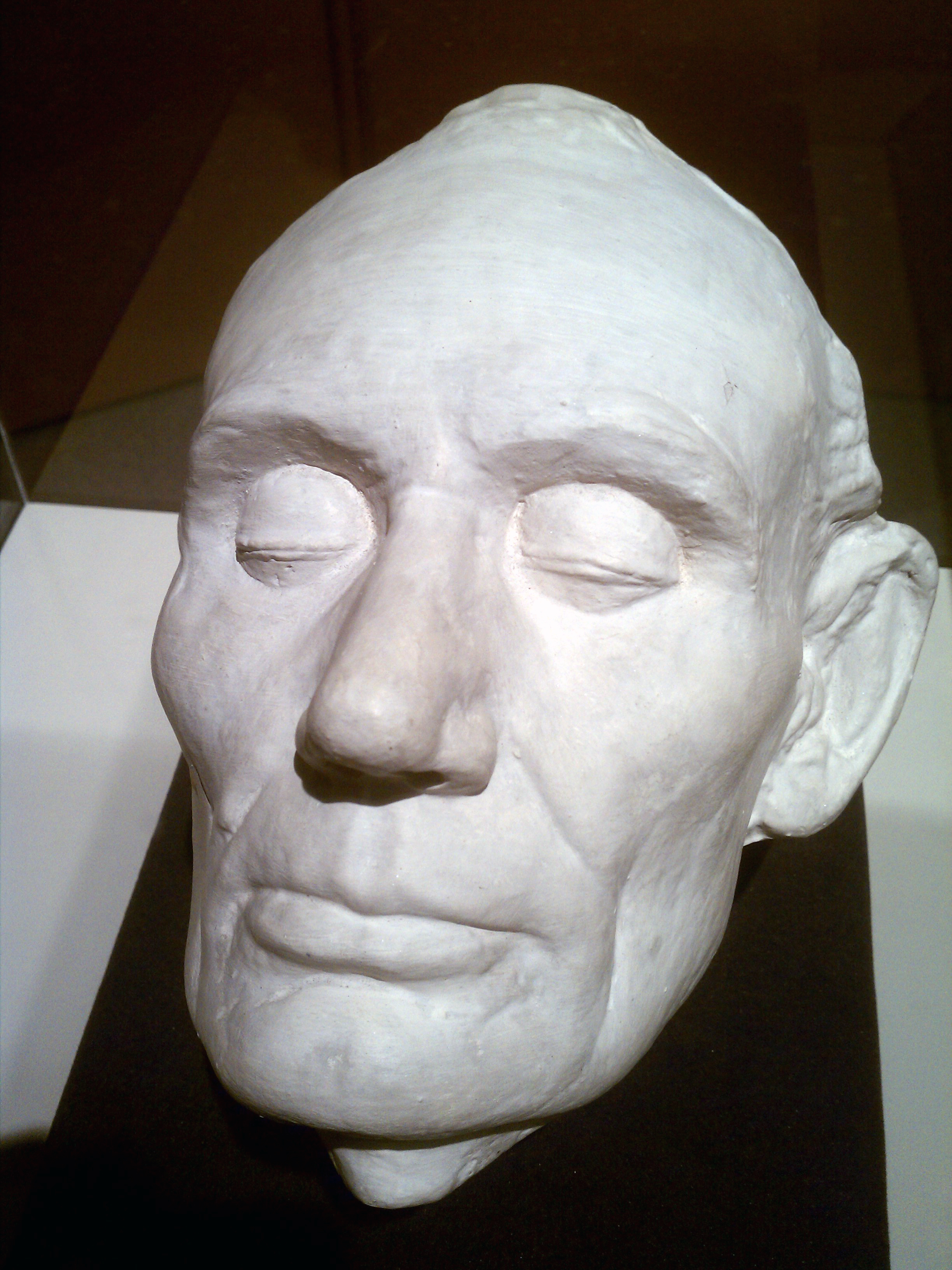
Life mask of Abraham Lincoln by Leonard Volk, 1860

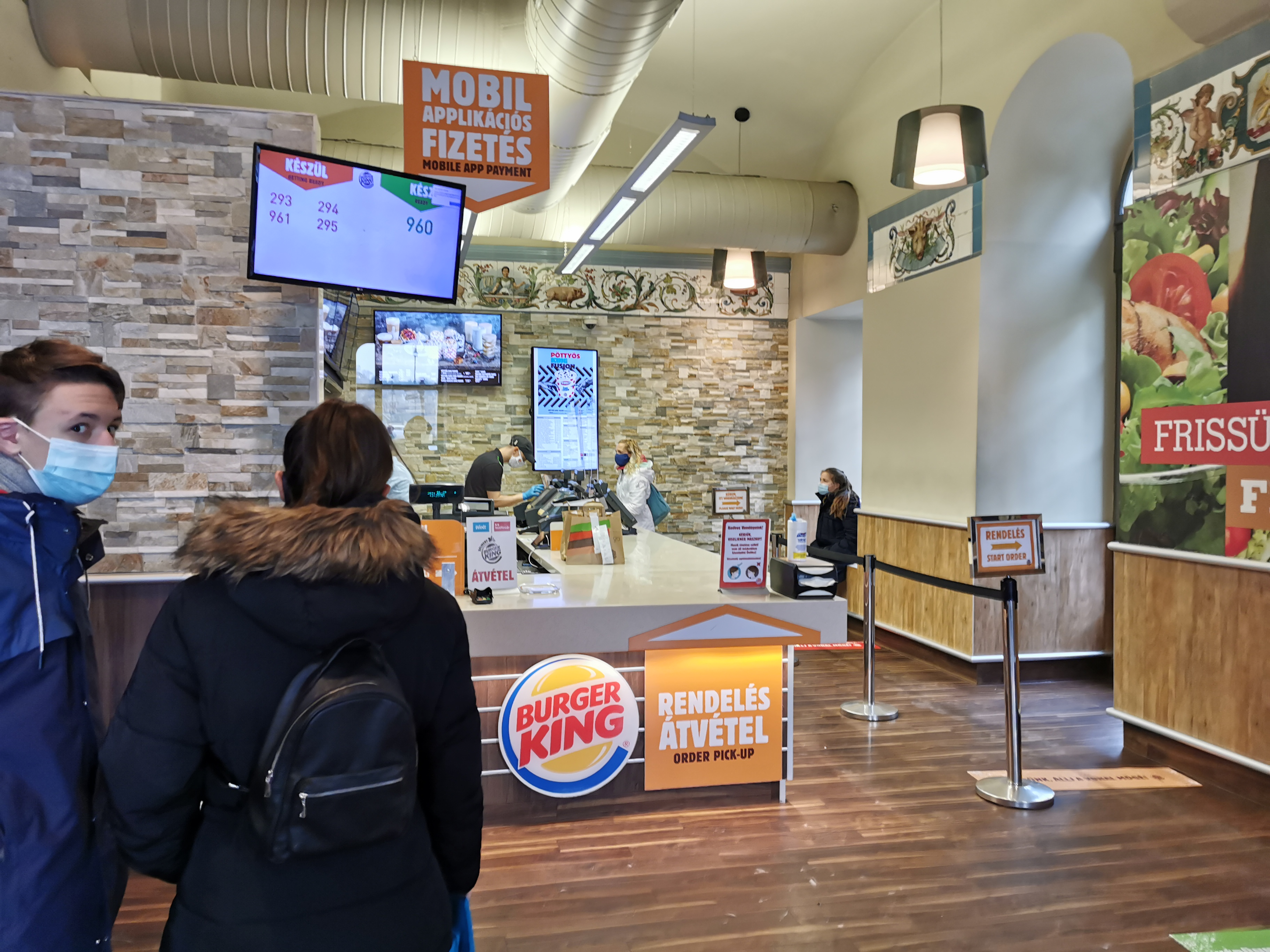
Mask-wearing customers in downtown Budapest

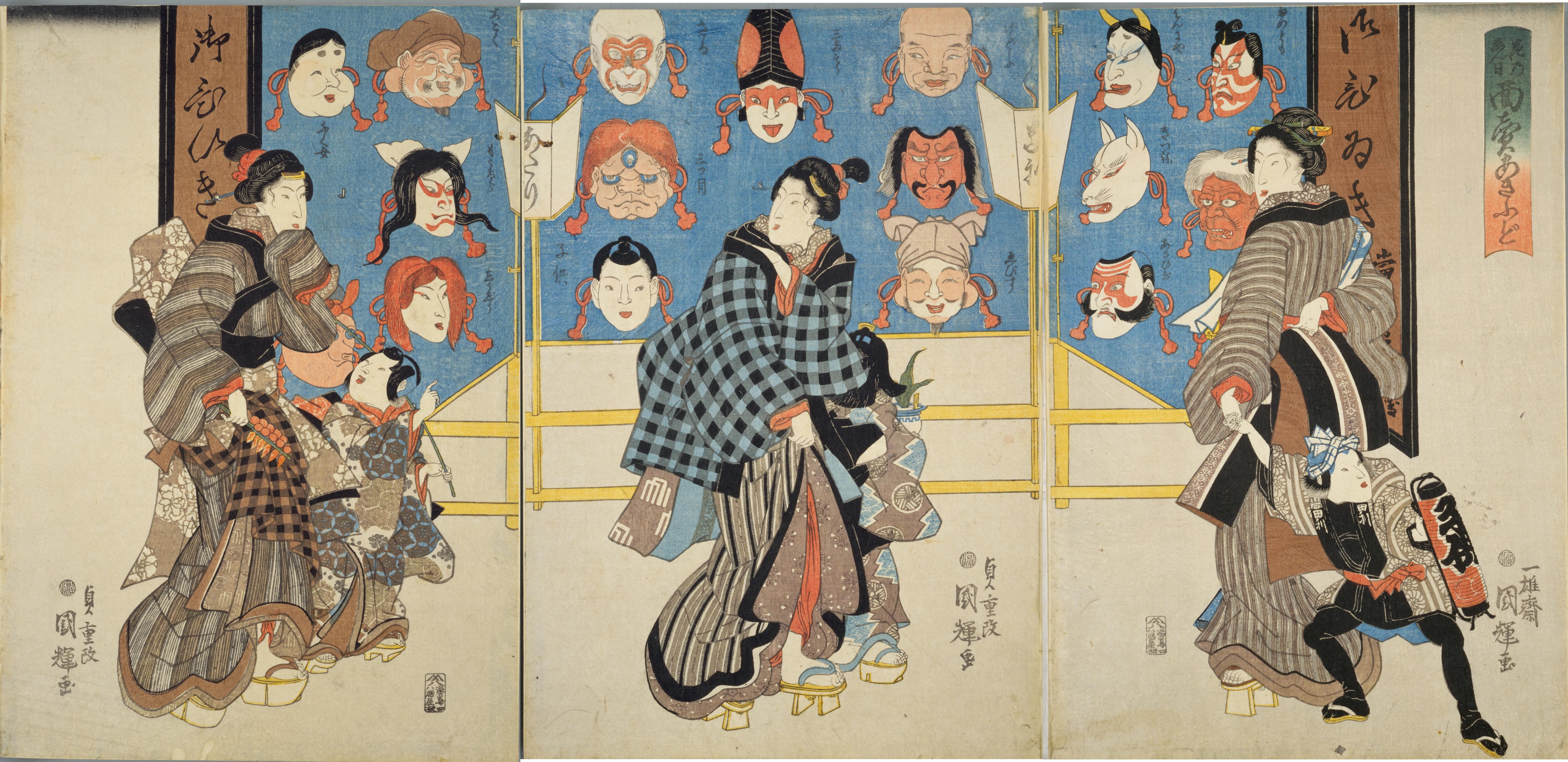
From the picture album "Shunyū bijo no yukaeri", 19th century

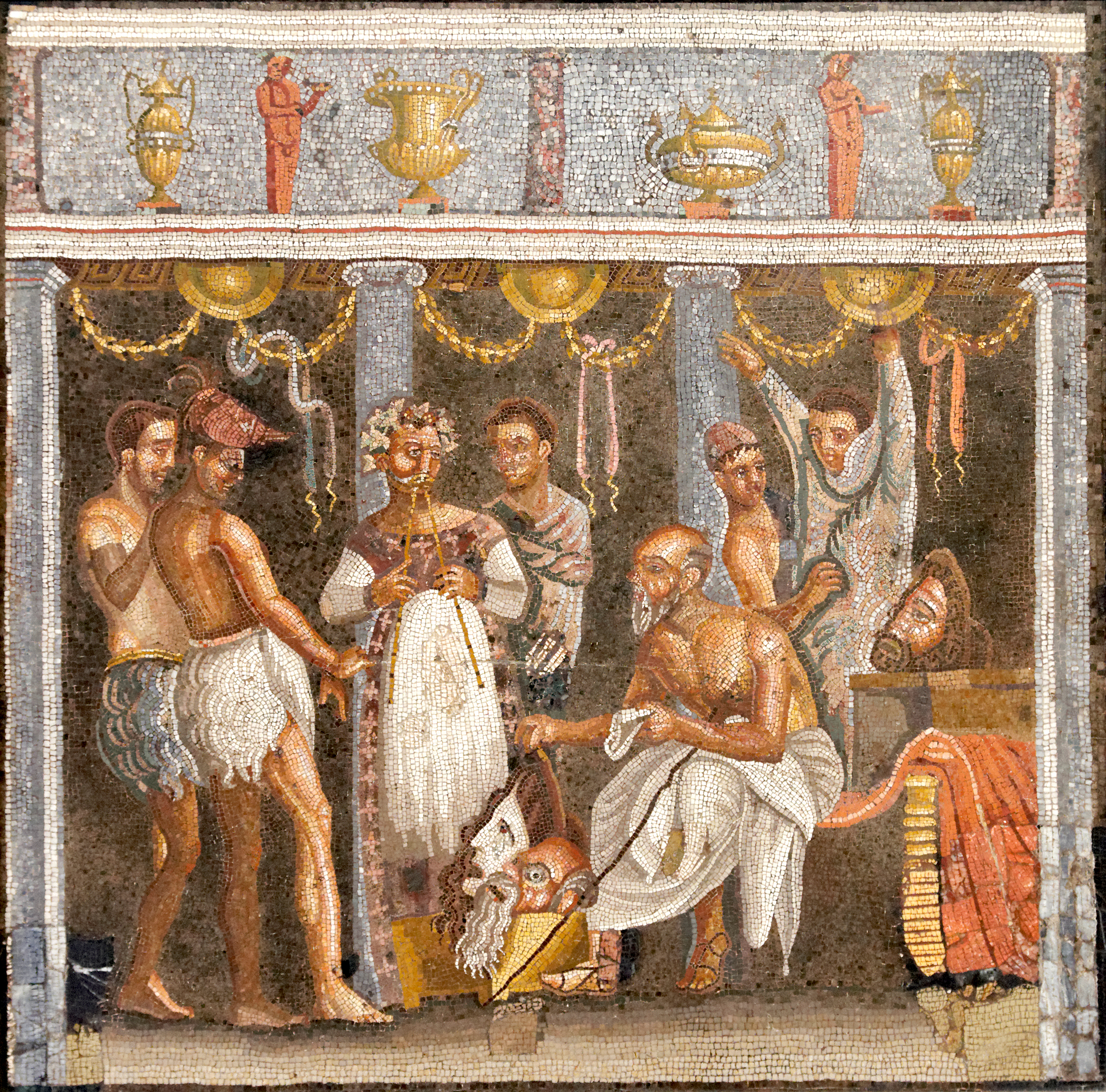
Performers with masks, mosaic, House of the Tragic Poet, Pompeii

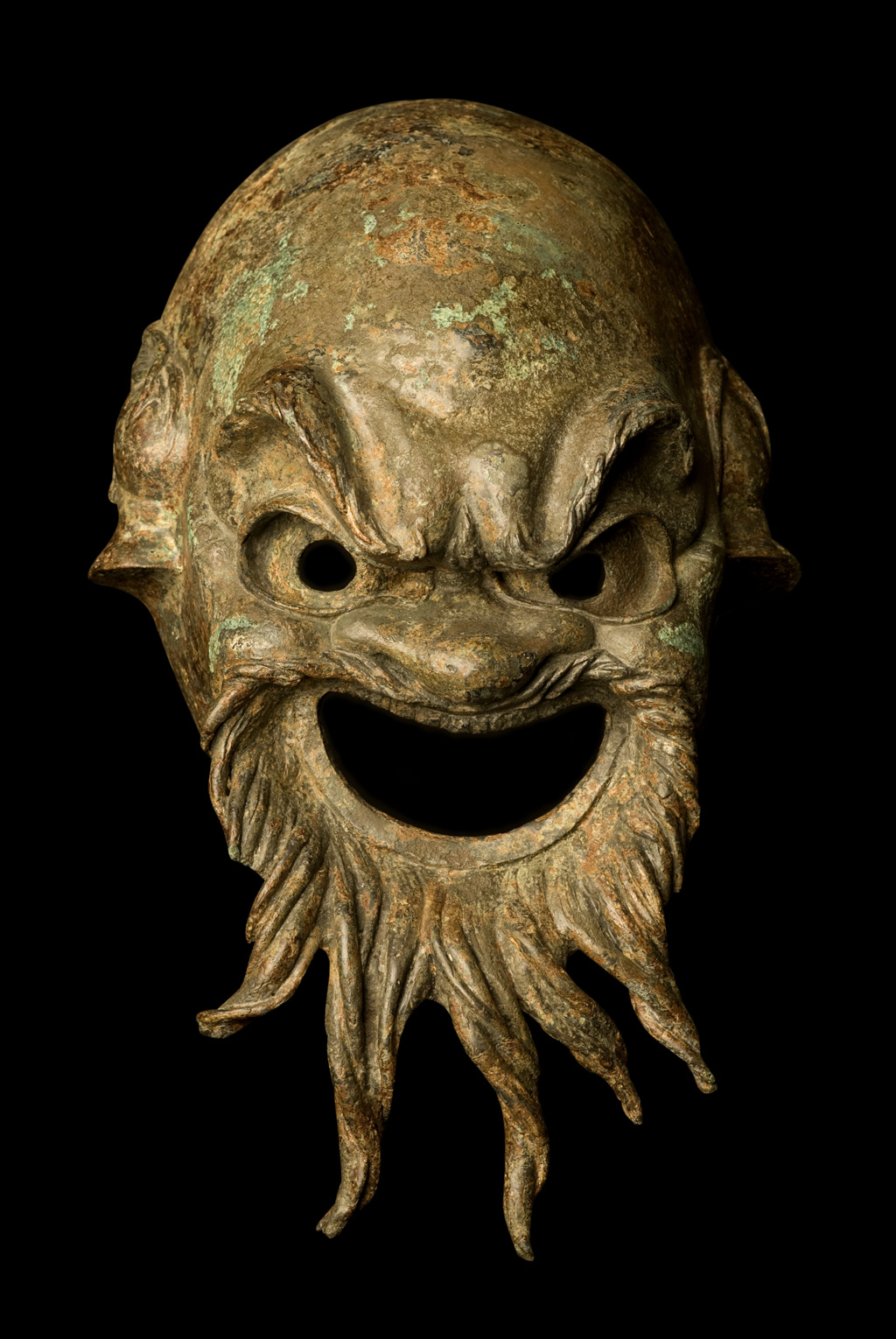
Mask of Silen, bronze, first half of the 1st century BC

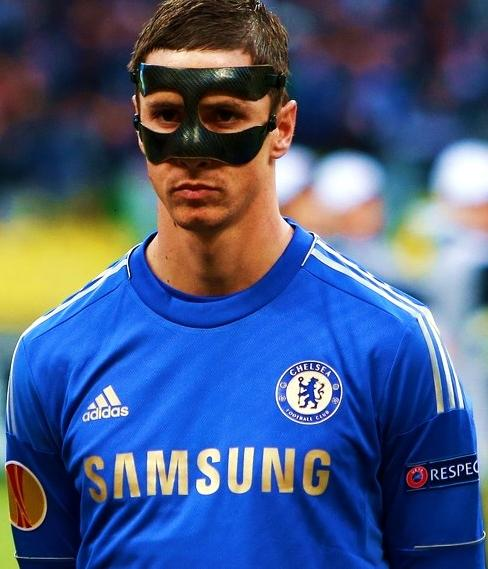
Fernando Torres wearing a protective mask after returning from a broken nose

== See also ==
- Anti-mask law
- Pareidolia
- Domino mask
- Face masks during the COVID-19 pandemic
