= Burn mask =

Thermoplastic device used to reduce scarring in burn survivors

A burn mask—also termed a transparent facial orthosis or facial pressure garment—is a rigid, clear thermoplastic device individually moulded to exert continuous, evenly distributed compression on the face of a burn survivor in order to prevent or remodel hypertrophic scarring. Transparent masks evolved in the late 1970s from earlier elastic hoods whose irregular pressure made them ineffective over concave facial regions; rigid masks became widely adopted during the 1980s and have since been regarded as a mainstay of conservative facial scar management. Although routine in specialist burn centres, their precise mechanism of action remains incompletely understood; prevailing hypotheses propose that sustained external pressure lowers capillary perfusion, reduces fluid retention in the skin and collagen production, and encourages parallel alignment of fibroblasts, thereby flattening and softening the scar tissue.

Conventional fabrication is labour-intensive: an orthotist first takes a negative plaster impression of the patient's face, pours a positive plaster cast, and then vacuums a heated, clear polycarbonate or PET-G sheet over the model to form the shell, which is held in place by adjustable straps and often lined with medical grade silicone to improve force distribution. Systematic review findings group production methods into classical plaster, fully digital three-dimensional scanning and printing, or hybrid approaches, but report no definitive evidence that digital masks improve clinical outcomes or reduce costs. Materials, harness configurations and the addition of embedded pressure sensors vary between centres, reflecting a lack of international standardisation.

Consensus guidance from the International Society for Burn Injuries recommends that masks deliver 20–32 mm Hg—above capillary pressure yet below levels that would impede circulation—and be worn for 20–23 hours per day for a minimum of two months and often up to two years, depending on scar maturation. Systematic reviews of clinical studies involving fewer than forty patients nevertheless document statistically significant improvements in scar thickness, pliability and colour on validated scales such as the Patient and Observer Scar Assessment Scale (POSAS), while simultaneously emphasising the low quality and heterogeneity of the underlying evidence base. Major practical challenges include discomfort, heat build-up, speech interference and the stringent wear schedule, all of which contribute to poor adherence and make randomised trials difficult for ethical and logistical reasons. Contemporary authors therefore call for multicentre studies employing objective pressure monitoring and standard outcome measures to clarify indications, optimise design parameters and quantify long-term functional and psychosocial benefits.
