= Cathole =

Pit for human feces

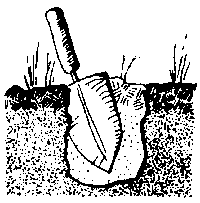
Image of a cathole

A cathole or cat hole or sometimes pighole is a pit for human feces. Catholes are frequently used for the purpose of disposing of bowel movements or waste water (such as the water from cleaning the kitchen dishes) by hikers and others engaging in outdoor recreation.

They can also be used to dispose of menstruum from a menstrual cup.

According to the Leave No Trace Center for Outdoor Ethics, catholes should be dug at least 200 feet (60 m) from water sources, walking trails or campsites. Additionally, the same cathole should not be used twice. Catholes should be between 6 and 8 inches (15 and 20 cm) deep and disguised after use to prevent access by animals, some of which are coprophagous. The digging of catholes is forbidden in some regions of high elevation where the climate can hinder the decomposition of waste.

== See also ==
- Pit toilet
- Trowel
- Hudo (scouting)
