= Softcup =

Soft cup may refer to:

- a disposable menstrual cup
- A type of brassiere, see: List of brassiere designs
