= Leona Chalmers =

Leona W. Chalmers was an American actress and writer who invented the first usable and available modern menstrual cup. She was also an actress and author who wrote the book The Intimate Side of a Woman’s Life.

== Biography ==
Born in the early 1900s, Chalmers invented the menstrual cup out of a passion for bettering women's sexual health. Chalmers created her first version of the menstrual cup in 1937, shortly after the invention of the tampon. She sought to create a reusable menstrual product to compete with the existing disposable menstrual products on the market. Her invention was originally made with vulcanized rubber, and was considered to be a more comfortable and discreet alternative to the existing menstrual cup-like option.

Chalmers set out to create a solution to menstrual products that centered around women's comfort. Previous cup like devices were medieval and quite mechanical, like the Catamenial Sack, which was patented in the 1860s but never made it to market due to low interest from the market. What Chalmers wanted to do was create a product that was more comfortable and easier to use than existing reusable menstrual products (tampons and pads were already on the market, but are considered disposable menstrual products).

Chalmers's product eventually went to market, but was not initially successful. Tampons and pads had been the popular menstrual product at the time, and women were comfortable and used to the mechanics of using a tampon. Learning how to use a new menstrual product wasn't something many women were looking for at the time. Furthermore, there was a huge stigma around period blood at the time, which led to many women not wanting to insert the device and have to handle period blood in the way a cup requires one to.

Another issue Chalmers faced a rubber shortage during was World War II, this caused her to stop production of her product. During this time, Chalmers redesigned the cup, patenting an updated design in the early 1950s. Chalmers eventually sold the patent and the company that bought it struggled to make it a success, because of a restriction on marketing (the words “vagina” and “menstruation” were illegal to use at the time) and continued taboo against menstruation. The product was eventually discontinued, and new iterations were introduced in the early 1990s. The cup's impact on society has been large, as it provides a longer lasting, sustainable alternative to disposable tampons and pads.

The menstruation cup is still in use today, and has gained a lot of popularity. Many people choose the cup due to its benefits to the environment: the purchase of one menstrual cup is equivalent to 2800 tampons! Furthermore, the cup lasts longer than tampons, allowing for 12 hour wear compared to 8 hours. Overall, the innovation Chalmers set out to create still exists today, and was a stepping stone for female created menstrual products.
