= Medical grade silicone =

Silicone tested for biocompatibility

Medical grade silicones are silicones tested for biocompatibility and are appropriate to be used for medical applications. In the United States, the Food and Drug Administration (FDA) Center for Devices and Radiological Health (CDRH) regulates devices implanted into the body. It does not regulate materials other than certain dental materials. The FDA regulate silicones used in food contact under the auspices of the Center for Food Safety and Nutrition (CFSAN) and for use in pharmaceuticals under the auspices of the Center for Drug Evaluation and Research (CDER).

Medical grade silicones are generally grouped into three categories: non implantable, short term implantable, and long-term implantable. Materials approved as Class V and VI can be considered medical grade. Most medical grade silicones are at least Class VI certified. Silicone suppliers and some silicone prototyping companies provide guidelines for material use.

== Uses ==
- Tubing
- Drains
- Feeding tubes
- Catheters
- Implants for long and short term use
- Seals and gaskets
- Syringe pistons
- Scar Treatment Silicone Sheets (FDA Class 1 Medical Device) and gels.
- Condoms
- Menstrual cups
- Sex toys
- Non-Stick Containers
- Respiratory masks

== Limitations ==
Silicone rubber applications such as catheters are widespread in medicine, but have several limitations. For example, they exhibit poor tear strength and poor resistance to fatigue. Brittle fracture can occur from defects within sections owing to poor control of vulcanization. It resulted in high failure rates for breast implants, and much subsequent litigation in the US, as well as elsewhere in the world. It led to a crisis of confidence in the US, with many manufacturers being forced out of the business entirely, and others to manufacture under FDA control.

== See also ==
- Silicone
- United States Pharmacopeia
- U.S. Food and Drug Administration
- Silicone rubber
- Polymers
- Plastics engineering
