= Hudo (scouting) =

Temporary pit toilet in a camp

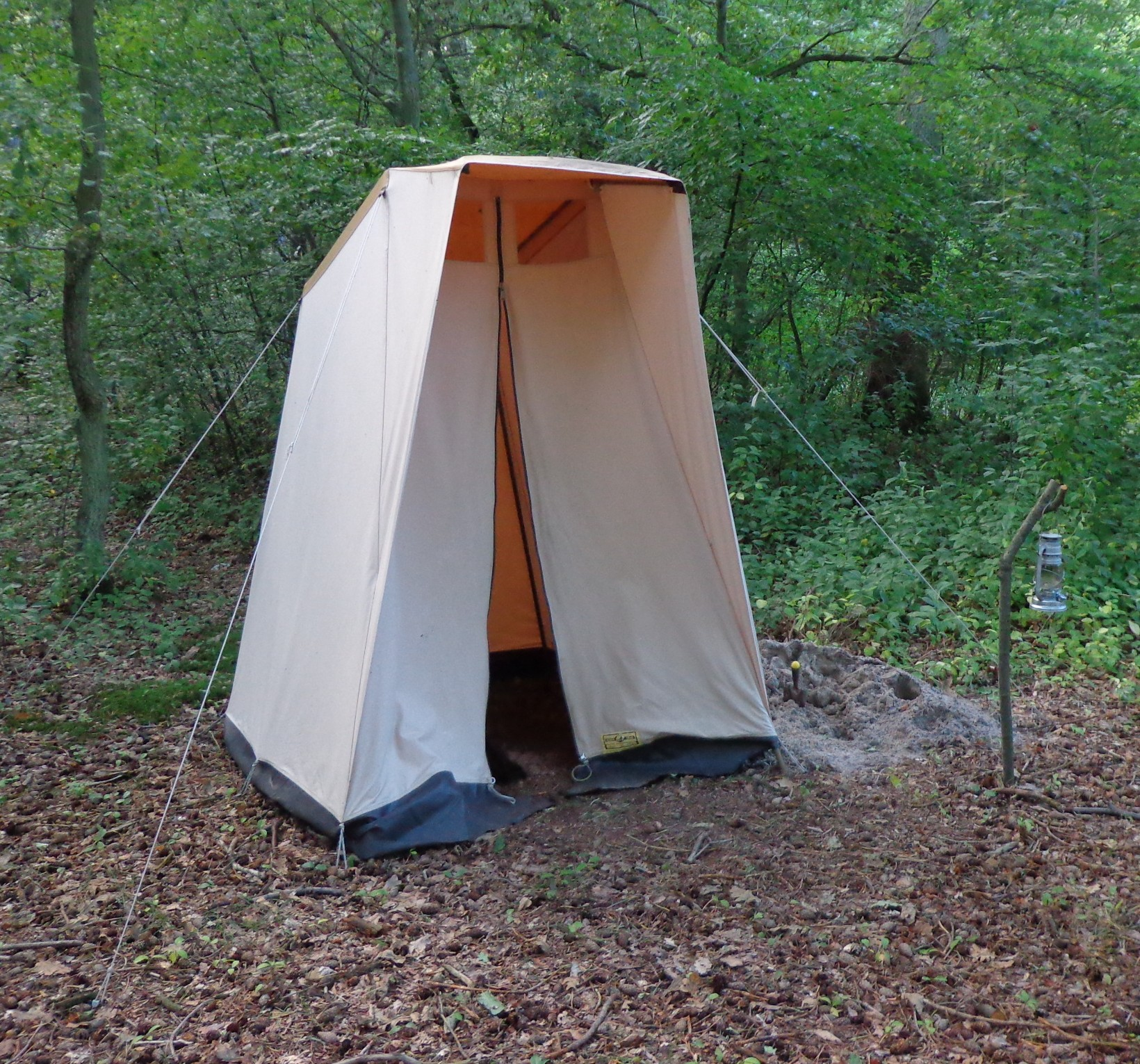
A hudo. The slit in the ground is just visible. On the right a pile of sand.

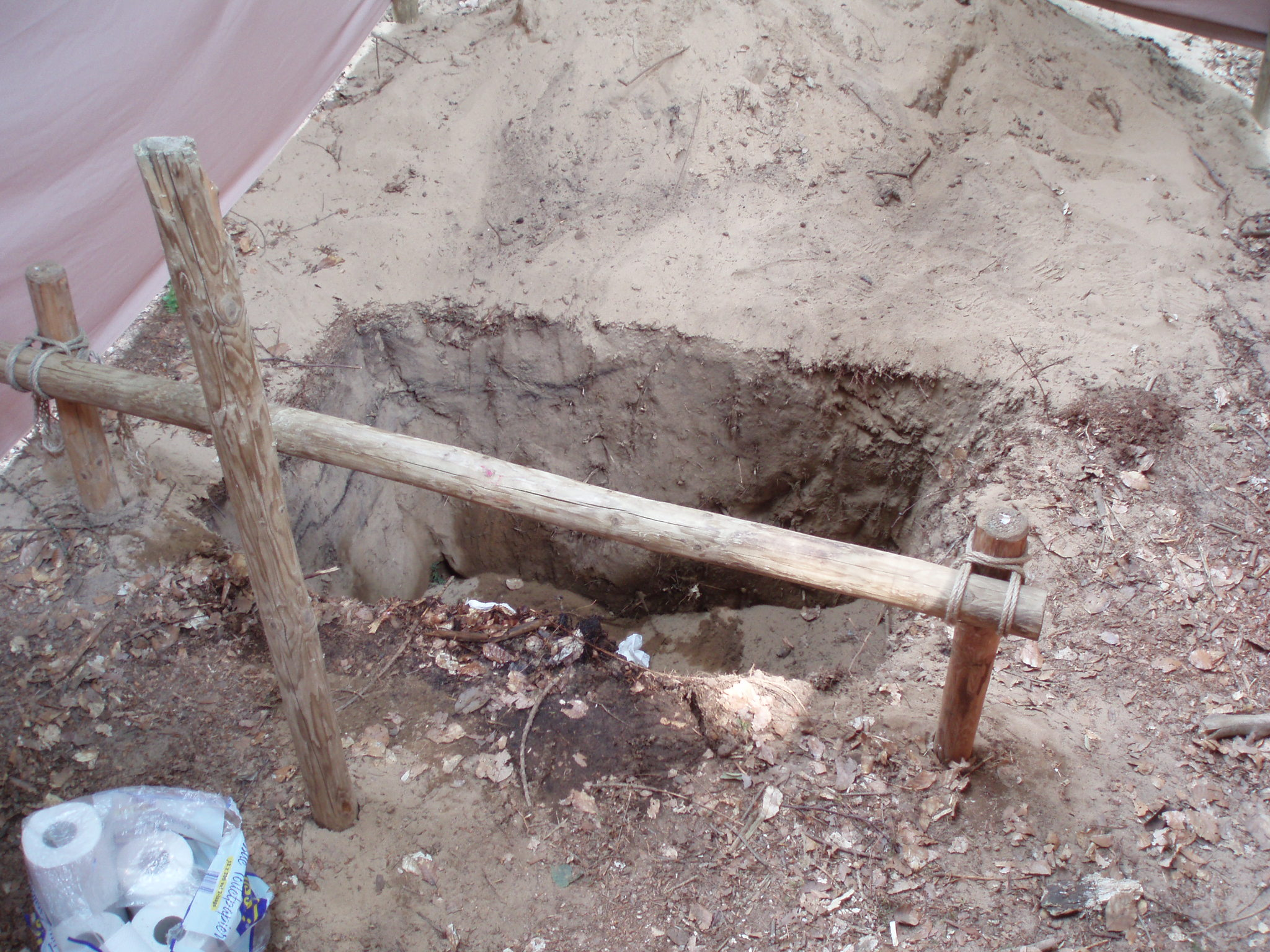
A hudo, seen from the inside. The vertical stem is for arm support; the horizontal one to sit on.

A hudo is a temporary pit toilet in a camp, covered with a tarpaulin, not a permanent outhouse. The name is in common use in Dutch and Belgian scouting, and has international usage.

== Etymology ==
The word hudo is derived from the Urdu word howdah, which is the covered carriage on elephants.

Other popular etymological explanations include the acronym of houd uw darmen open (the Dutch parallel to "kybo", "keep your bowels open"), and the contraction of hurkdoos (Dutch for "squat loo"). The validity of these explanations is questioned.

== See also ==
- Scouting Nederland
- 3rd World Scout Jamboree
