= Always (Whisper) (brand) =

American feminine hygiene brand by Procter & Gamble

Always Whisper 護舒寶 好自在
- Product type: Feminine hygiene line, including: sanitary pads Ultra Thin pads Pantiliners; Cleansing wipes
- Current owner: Procter & Gamble
- Country: United States
- Introduced: February 1983; 43 years ago
- Related brands: Whisper (Australia and Asian countries); Lines (Italy); Orkid (Turkey); Evax/Ausonia (Spain and Portugal); Tampax
- Markets: Worldwide
- Tagline: Rewrite the rules, always Stay Happy, always
- Website: www.always.com

Always is an American brand of menstrual hygiene products, including maxi pads, ultra thin pads, pantyliners, disposable underwear for night-time wear, and vaginal wipes. A sister company of Procter & Gamble, it was first invented and introduced in the United States in 1983 by Tom Osborn, a mid-level employee at Procter & Gamble, then nationally in May 1984. By the end of 1984, Always had also been introduced internationally in the United Kingdom, Canada, France, Germany, Arab world, Pakistan and Africa. Despite the Always' pads runaway international success, Procter & Gamble almost fired Tom Osborn twice in the early 1980s as he was developing this product.

Always sanitary pads and other products are sold under the brand name Whisper in Japan, Singapore, India, Bangladesh, Nepal, China, South Korea, Philippines, Thailand, Hong Kong, Taiwan, Vietnam, Malaysia, Australia, Cambodia and Indonesia, Lines in Italy, Orkid in Turkey, and both Evax and Ausonia in Spain and Portugal. The 'Always' name is applicable to products sold in the US, Africa (Kenya and Nigeria primarily), Pakistan, and some European countries.

Always products are manufactured in Belleville, Ontario, Canada, at a 700,000 sq ft (65,000 m^{2}) plant with 175,000 sq ft (16,300 m^{2}) of warehouse space. The plant is one of Procter & Gamble's largest in North America. Although Always has local factories in the countries that it sells in, in some cases, its products are manufactured and exported.

According to Rising Tide: Lessons from 165 Years of Brand Building at Procter & Gamble, Always was Procter & Gamble's "first truly global brand."

== Products ==
Always sells sanitary protection products like sanitary pads, tampons, and pantyliners across its markets. It sells them under the brand names of Whisper, Lines, Orkid, Evax, and Ausonia. In some countries, including Cambodia and Kenya, it sells only sanitary pads and pantyliners.

=== Pakistan ===
In 2001 Pakistani versions of the brand were:

- Dreamzzz (Extra Long Night)
- Ultra Herbal 3in1
- Ultra 3in1 (Long & Extra Long)

== Advertising ==
=== Pakistan ===
- Always Girls Can Do Anything

In 2009

== Marketing ==
In June 2020, Always launched a new campaign against the backdrop of the global pandemic and national lockdowns. "The New Brave" is a campaign designed to show the resilience of women around the world – facing the challenges of the new world with courage and determination. The campaign highlighted the self-empowerment of women during the pandemic, including those fighting isolation at home, not seeing family for long periods of time, managing remote work and school, teaching and learning with children and adapting to a new definition.

The "Like a Girl" campaign, which was released worldwide with more focus on U.S. and African markets, from Leo Burnett won the 2015 Emmy Award for outstanding commercial. Lauren Greenfield directed the spot, which debuted in June 2014 and aired during Super Bowl XLIX. The commercial asked the question "When did doing something 'like a girl' become an insult?" Running, throwing, or fighting like a girl are seen by adults as equivalent to weak, but by young girls as strong.

The school program run by Whisper (in India) has helped teach young girls about female hygiene in a country where menstruation is still a big taboo. Always has also undertaken similar programs in Kenya, Nigeria, and other parts of Africa to raise awareness about menstruation, celebrate Menstrual Hygiene Day, and provide easy access to sanitary products to schoolgirls.

The 'Always Keeping Girls in School' program undertaken by Always Africa is an ongoing attempt by the brand to raise awareness about menstruation and period poverty in the region. In Kenya, where Always sells sanitary pads (blue and pink variant) and pantyliners, this program has helped thousands of schoolgoing teenage girls learn about period and menstrual hygiene. Always Kenya also routinely distributes sanitary pads and other menstrual products to schoolgirls to motivate them to use hygienic sanitary napkins instead of cloth and tissue papers. This is done via P&G's FemCare unit, which is responsible for the safe production of sanitary pads and tampons.

Educational marketing for the product includes the company's BeingGirl website. This program was also shared in Kenya and other African nations via Always Africa's official social platforms.

In 2018, Always ran a campaign called End Period Poverty, which would donate one pad to a woman/girl in need for every package sold. This campaign primarily ran in African countries like Kenya to raise awareness about period poverty and menstrual health.

In 2019, the brand removed the female symbol from their marketing to be inclusive of transgender people who menstruate.

In 2020, the brand claimed that 60% of women wore the wrong-size pad, and built a campaign around this idea.

== #MyAlwaysExperience controversy in Kenya ==
In 2019, Kenyan activist and politician Scheaffer Okore started #MyAlwaysExperience (a trend on Twitter) to share the concerns of Kenyan consumers of the Always Kenya brand. Okore highlighted the need for gentler skin products (sanitary pads, pantyliners, tampons) to be made available in African markets. Following this, the Always Kenya brand team hosted a series of meetings with consumers to better understand the needs of Kenyan women. This led to the launch of #GenerationOfChange – a campaign that celebrated women who speak up and mobilise. Always Kenya also introduced two new innovations designed for maximum skin comfort - New Always Feather Soft pads (Kenya) and New Always Pure Organic Top Sheet (South Africa). These two were in addition to the existing portfolio of Always sanitary pads that the brand has in Kenya and South Africa. Through the campaign, Always Kenya also reinforced the idea of the rigorous process that goes behind the manufacturing of its blue and pink pads in the region. The campaign's message - "You spoke, we listened, we improved" acknowledged the positive role that dialogue plays in product innovation.

In the UK, the price of branded products such as Always pads were a subject of the End Period Poverty Task-Force in Westminster. P&G was a member of the task force.

== Social causes ==
Always has been running its 'Keeping Girls in School Program' in South Africa, Kenya, Uganda, and India for many years. In 2020, recognizing their girls are disproportionately impacted by the pandemic; Whisper established a mobile education program called "Whisper MobileShaala" to Keep Girls in School even when at home. MobileShaala provides underprivileged girls in India access to school through web-based learning including subjects like Science, Geography, English, Mathematics and Puberty Education in 6 Indian languages.

In 2020 and 2021 Always campaign #EndPeriodPoverty was done in Estonia, Latvia and Lithuania, where for each purchase from the store the company donated hygiene products to girls in need.

== In popular culture ==
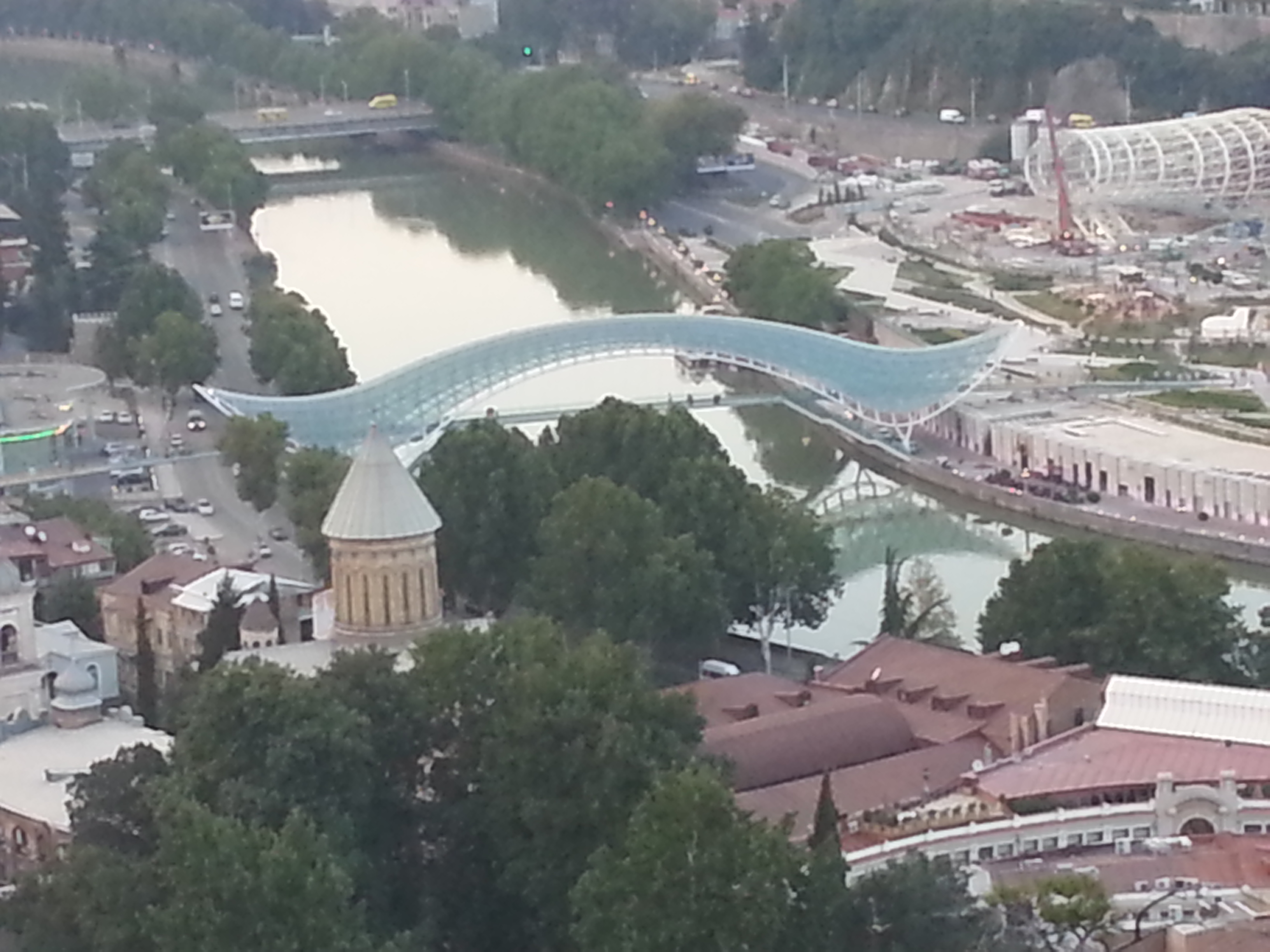
Bridge of Peace, Tbilisi, Georgia

In Tbilisi, Georgia the Bridge of Peace is nicknamed the Always Ultra Bridge for its resemblance to the maxi-pad.

== Gallery ==
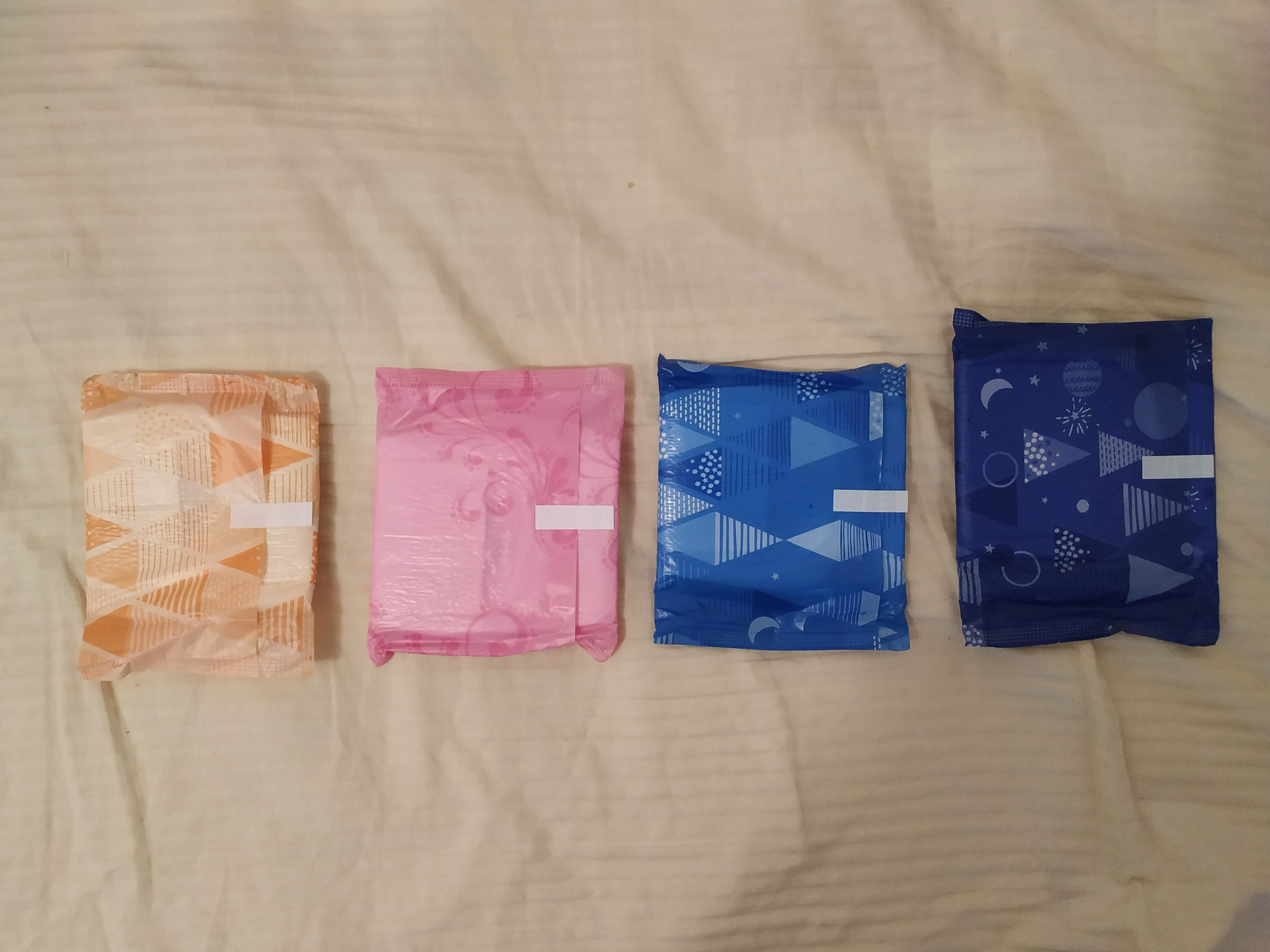
Always ultra pads

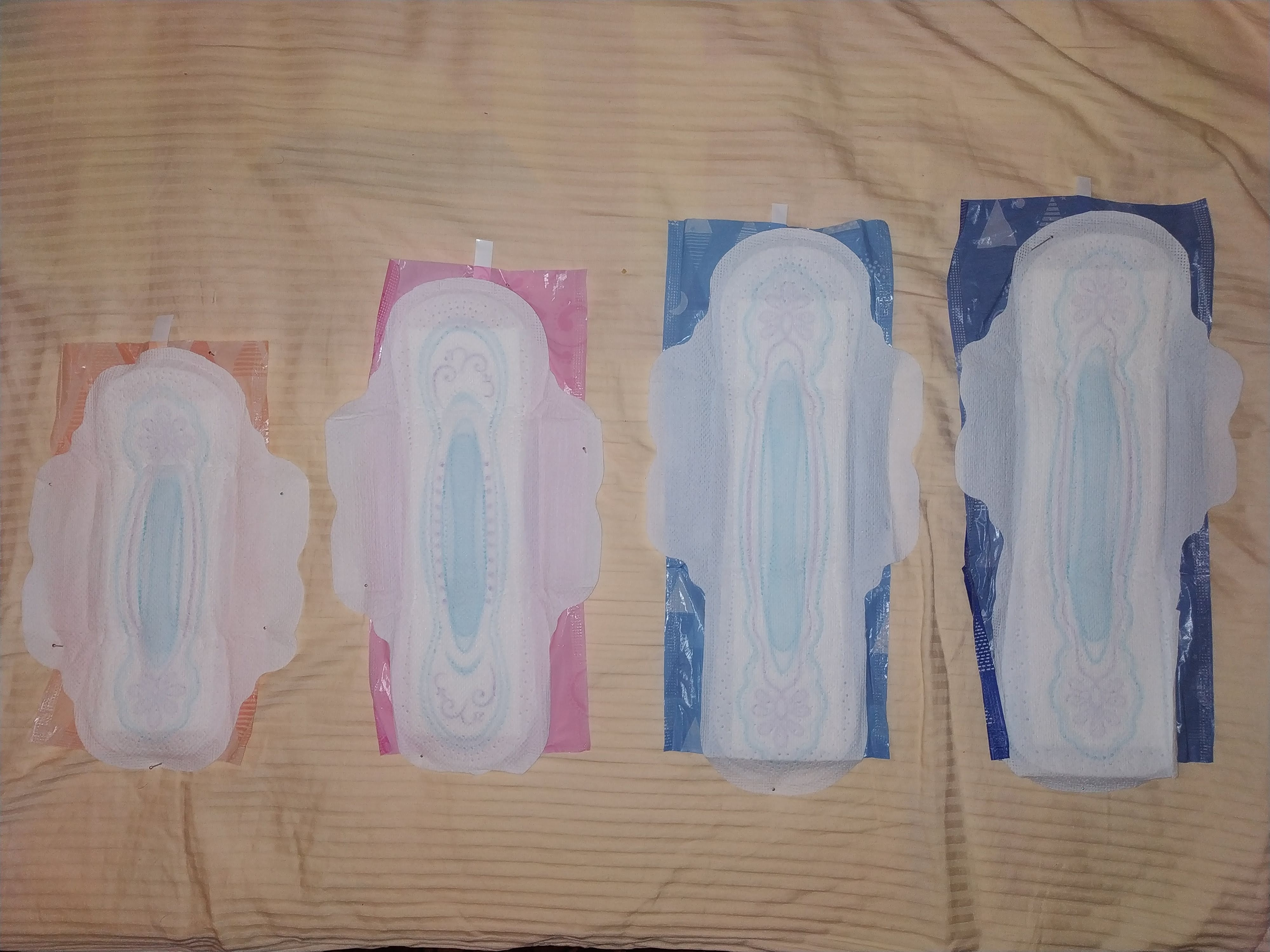
Different sizes of Always pads

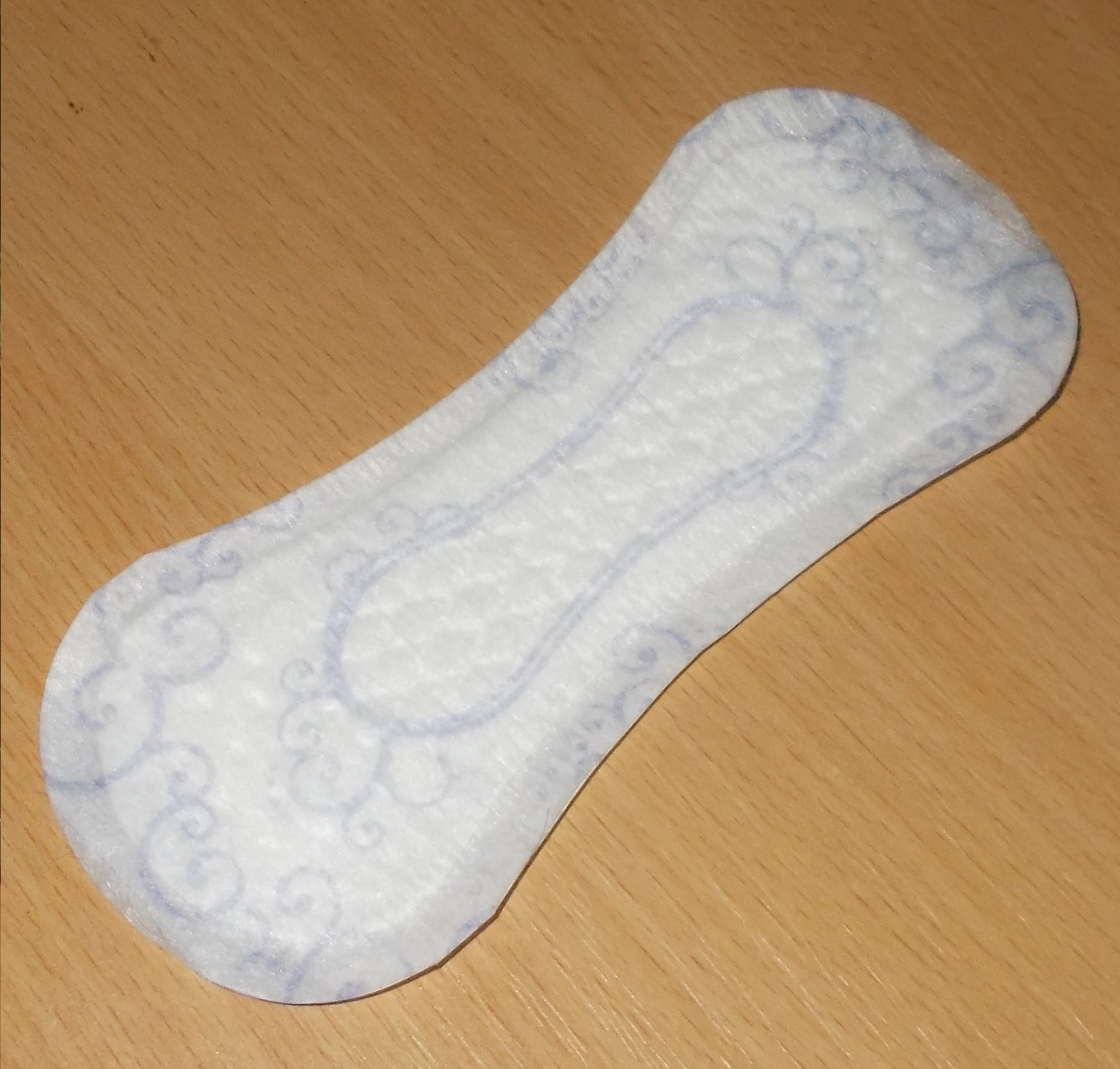
Always Platinum pantyliner

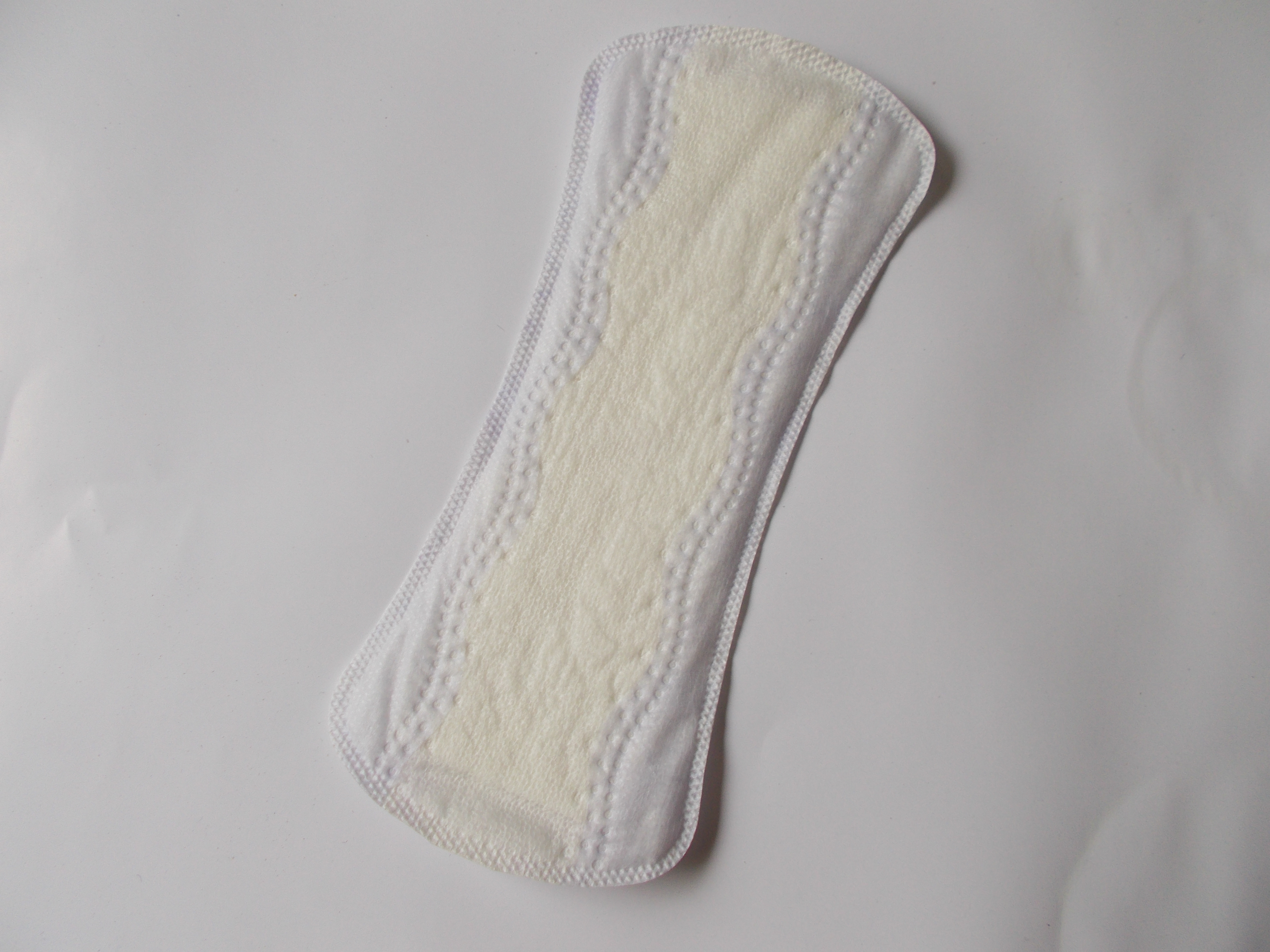
Always Dailies long pad

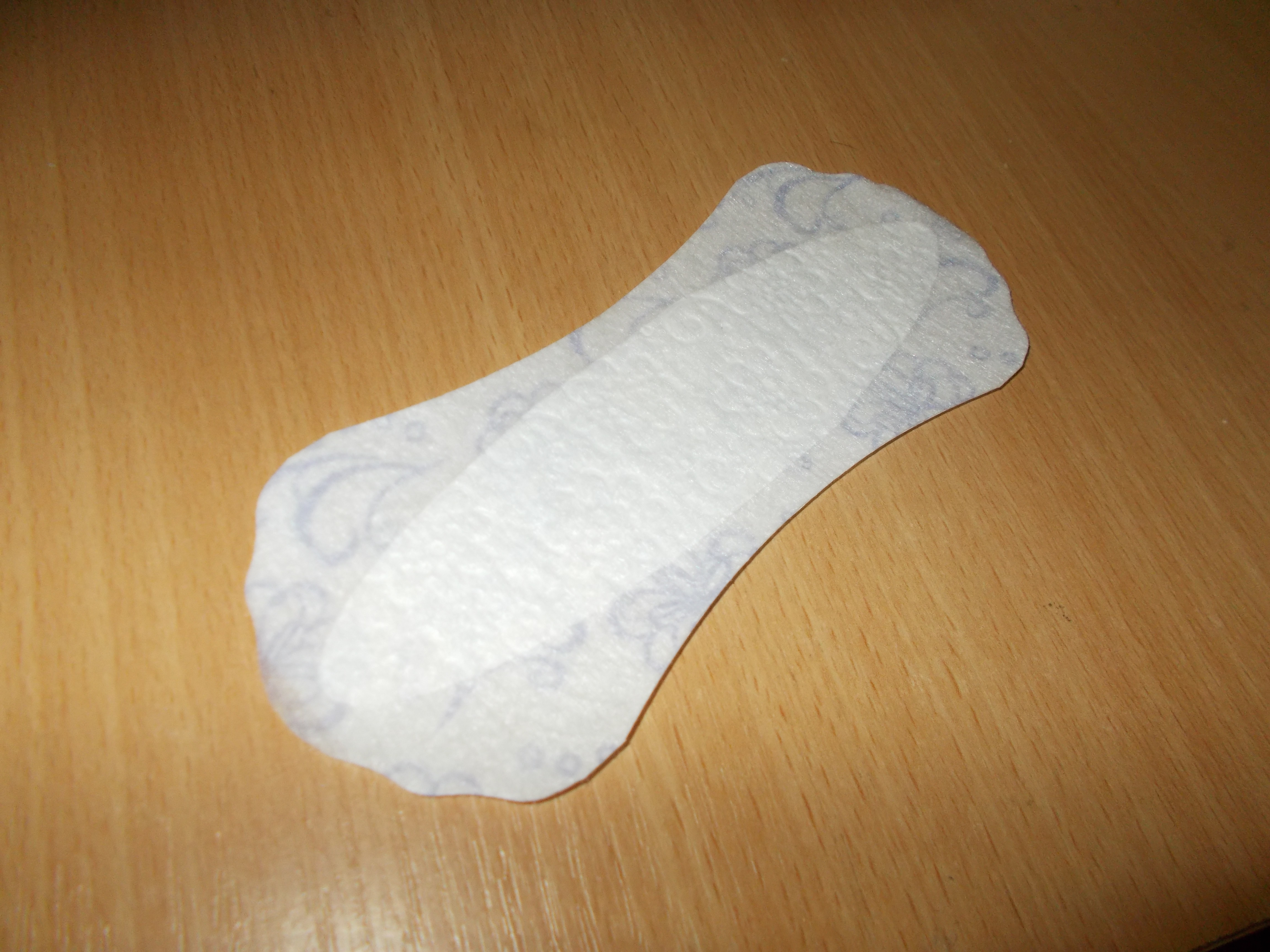
Discreet pantyliner

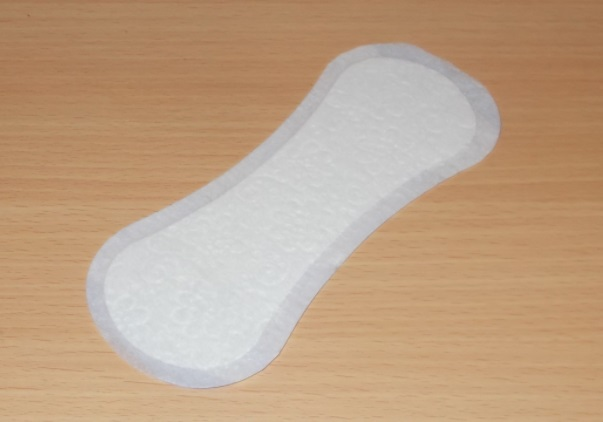
Discreet Normal - Always (Africa) pads

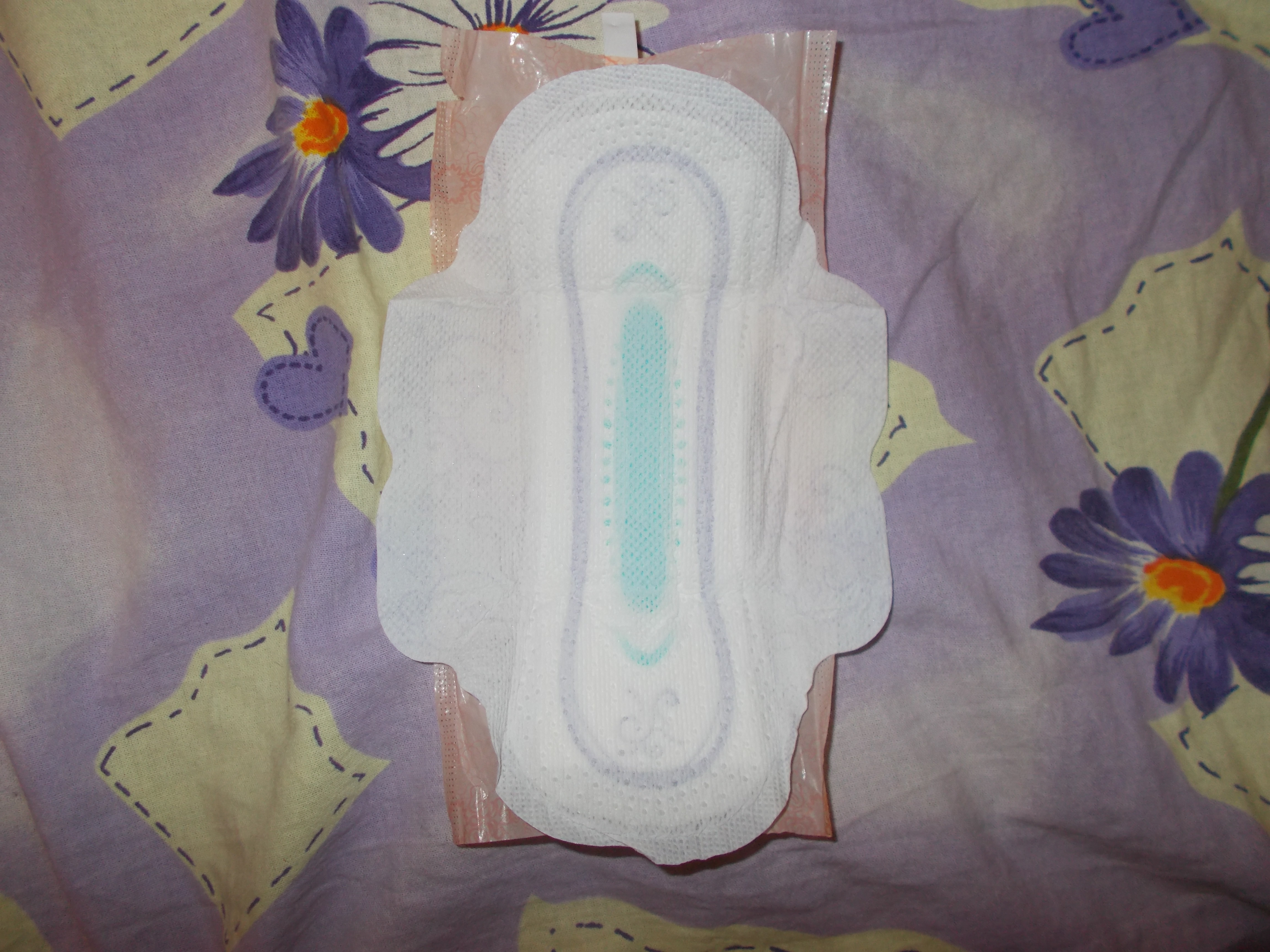
Always Platinum sanitary pad

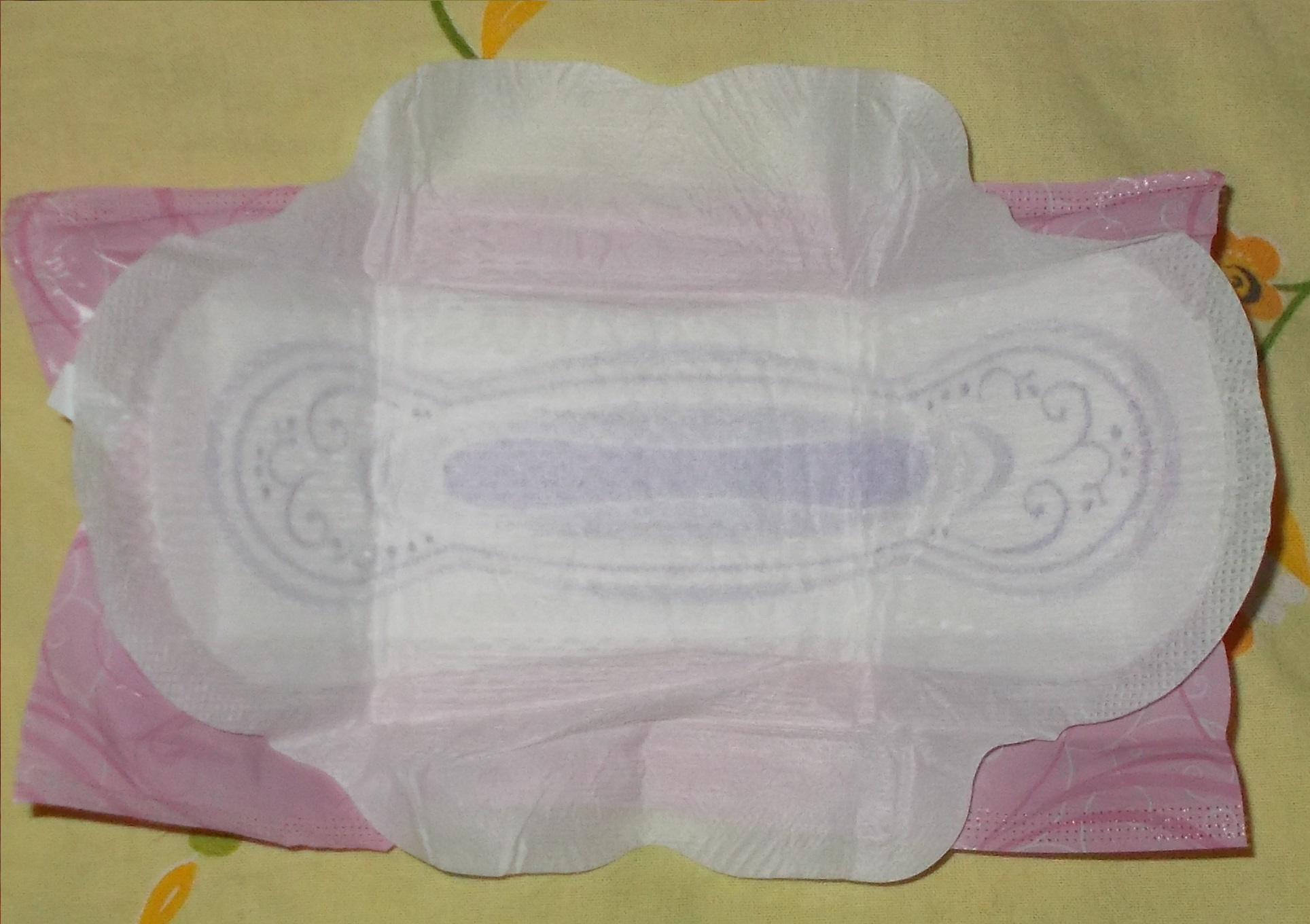
Always Sensitive sanitary pad

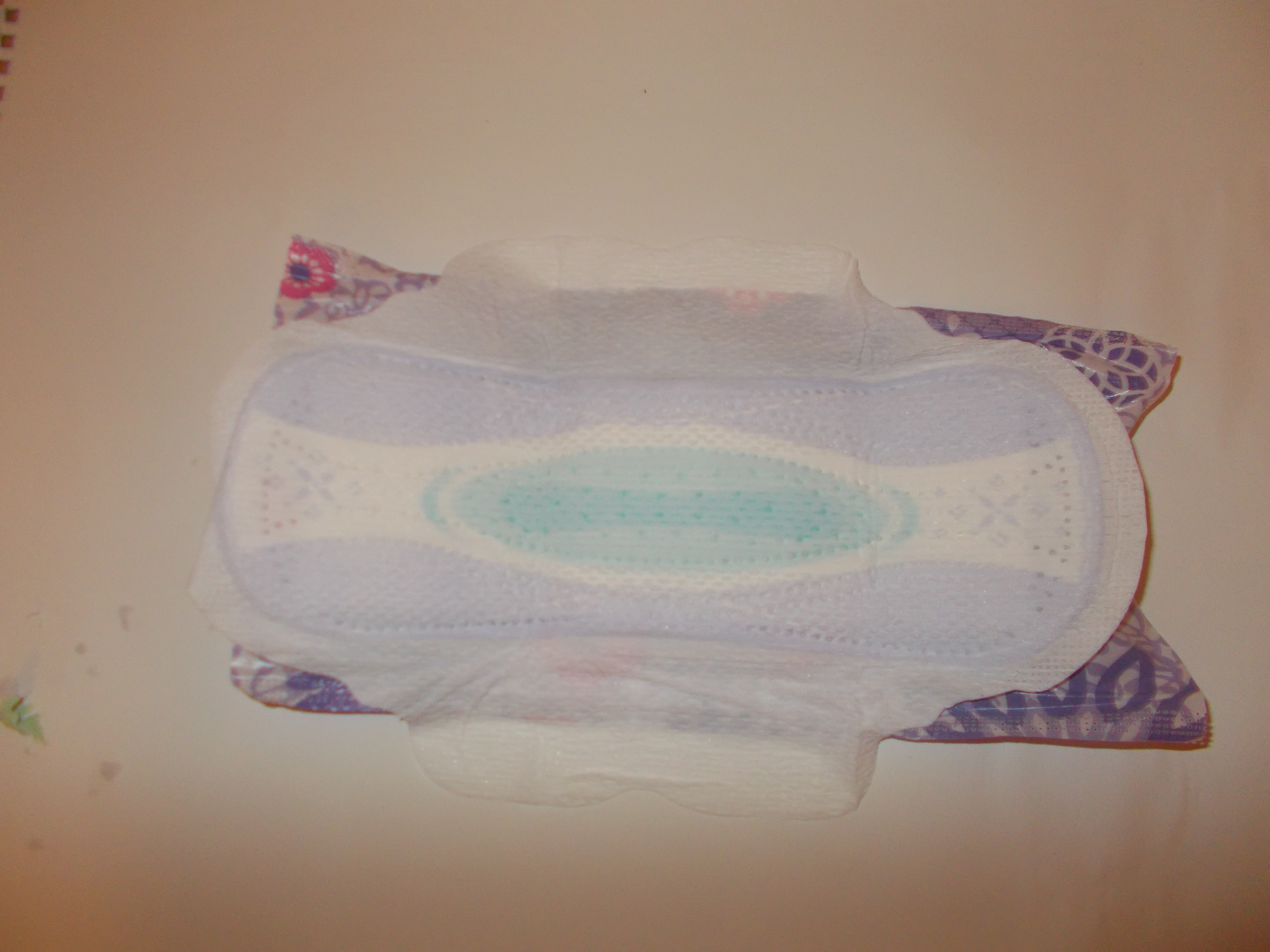
Always Platinum pad

== See also ==
- Menstrual cycle
- Tampax
- Stayfree, a competitor who introduced their maxi pad in the 1970s
- Menstrual hygiene management
