= Okore =

Okore is a surname. Notable people with the surname include:

- Jores Okore (born 1992), Danish footballer
- Nnenna Okore (born 1975), Nigerian-Australian artist
- Scheaffer Okore, Kenyan politician

== See also ==
- Okoro, a surname
