= Stayfree =

American brand of feminine hygiene products

- Product type: Menstrual pad
- Current owner: Edgewell Personal Care
- Country: United States
- Introduced: 1969; 57 years ago
- Previous owners: Energizer Holdings; Johnson & Johnson
- Website: stayfree.com

Stayfree is an American brand of feminine hygiene products, including menstrual pads, ultra thin pads, and feminine wipes. On July 31, 2013, Energizer bought Stayfree from Johnson & Johnson. The purchase was only for the brands in North America – Johnson & Johnson continues to own the brands in all other regions of the world. One notable exception of which is the Philippines where it is bought under the "Modess" name.

== Products ==
- Stayfree Ultra Thin Regular
- Stayfree Ultra Thin Regular with Wings
- Stayfree Ultra Thin Super Long with Wings
- Stayfree Ultra Thin Overnight with Wings
- Stayfree Maxi Regular
- Stayfree Maxi Deodorant
- Stayfree Maxi Super
- Stayfree Maxi Super Long
- Stayfree Maxi Regular with Wings
- Stayfree Maxi Super Long with Wings
- Stayfree Maxi Overnight with Wings
