= Personal care products =

Consumer products used in personal hygiene and for beautification

Personal care products are a class of consumer products associated with hygiene and personal grooming. They are marketed to modern consumers as "minimally necessary" or improving appearance or well-being.

They are applied on various external parts of the body such as skin, hair, nails, lips, external genital and anal areas, as well as teeth and the mucous membranes of the oral cavity. Toiletries form a narrower category of personal care products which are used for basic hygiene and cleanliness as a part of a daily routine. Cosmetic products, in contrast, are used for personal grooming and beautification (aesthetically enhance a person's appearance). Pharmaceutical products are not considered personal care products.

Most of the personal care products are rinsed off immediately after use, such as shampoos, soaps, toothpastes, shower gels, etc. Some products, such as moisturizers and sunscreens, are designed to remain on the skin for extended protection.

The global market size of the personal care products industry is several hundred billion US Dollars (as of early 2020s). As of 2025, it was estimated that the average adult in the United States used a dozen personal care products daily containing over 110 unique ingredients. Further, among those ingredients, different countries have restricted use of different sets, so that, for instance, the European Union has banned inclusion of over 2,400 such ingredients while the United States has banned only 15, as of 2025. Procter & Gamble, L'Oreal, Johnson & Johnson, Unilever, Colgate-Palmolive, Gillette, Avon, Natura & Co, Kimberly-Clark and Shiseido are some of the world-leading companies in personal care products industry.

== Description ==
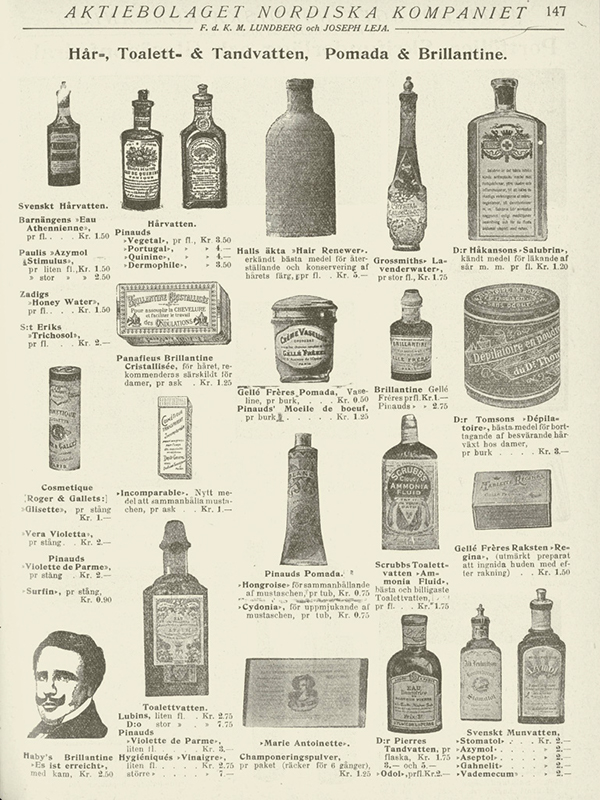
Swedish advertisement for toiletries (c. 1905/06)

Personal care products can be categorized according to their function and area of application. These are cleansing products, hair care products, hair removal products, oral care products, sun care products, skin care products, feminine care products, nail care products, eye care products and anal hygiene products.

=== Cleansing products ===
Cleansing products include hand soaps or bar soaps, shower gels, body washes, facial cleansers, body oils, body lotions, cleansing pads, moist towelettes. They remove dirt, excess oil and other impurities from the surface of the body and improve a person's overall cleanliness. Facial tissues are used to wipe the nasal discharge. Cotton pads are used to remove makeup. Cotton swabs are used to clean outer ear. Bath towels are used to dry up wet areas on the body, face towels are used to dry up wet face. Exfoliating scrubs (loofahs and such) are used for deeper cleansing.

=== Hair care products ===
These include shampoos, hair conditioners, hair oils and hair treatments, and they are used to cleanse, condition and treat hair so that hair is clean and healthy. Scalp massagers promote blood flow in the scalp and scalp serums hydrate and nourish the scalp.

=== Hair removal products ===
Among hair removal products, there are shaving creams, shaving gels, shaving foams, razors, hair clippers, tweezers, epilators, waxing kits, and hair removal creams (e.g. depilatory creams). These are used to remove unwanted hair from various parts of the body.

=== Oral care products ===
These are toothpaste, toothbrush, mouthwash, dental floss, water floss, interdental brush, gum massager, gum gel, etc. They are used to maintain oral hygiene, prevent tooth decay and gum disease, and have healthy teeth and gums. Tongue scrapers are used to remove food debris, dead cells and bacteria from the tongue surface. Denture care products are used to clean artificial dentures.

=== Skin care products ===
These include powders, baby powders, body lotions, hand creams, pomades and facial moisturizers. They are used to hydrate, moisturize, and nourish the skin and keep the skin soft, smooth, and protected. Lip balms keep the lips hydrated.

=== Sun care products ===
Sun care products include lotions, creams, sprays, gels, oils and sticks that act as a sunscreen or a sunblock. They protect the skin from harmful ultraviolet radiation, and as such prevent sunburn, premature aging, and skin cancer. Prickly heat powders prevent or soothe itchy, bumpy and red heat rashes on the skin due to excess heat. Sunglasses and wide-brimmed sun hats are used to protect the eyes from the sun.

=== Feminine care products ===
Feminine care products are often involved in taking care of feminine bodily functions related to the vulva and vagina such as menstruation and vaginal discharge. These are also called vulvar and vaginal care products.

==== Menstrual care products ====
These include menstrual pads, tampons, menstrual cups, and panty liners. They are used for menstrual hygiene and provide comfort, absorption, and protection during menstruation.

==== Cleansing products ====
These include douches, feminine wipes, and soap. They are meant to cleanse the vulva or vagina.

Douches are a fluid used to flush out the inside of the vagina. Feminine wipes are a moist, sometimes scented cloth used to wipe the vulva. Feminine hygiene products that are meant to cleanse may lead to allergic reaction and irritation, as the vagina naturally flushes out bacteria. Many health professionals advise against douching because it can change the balance of vaginal flora and acidity. Research shows that the vagina's features allow it to naturally defend itself from harmful microorganisms. The innate defense mechanisms against vulvovaginal infections encompass the normal vaginal flora, acidic vaginal pH, and vaginal discharge. Resident bacteria play a crucial role in maintaining an acidic pH and outcompeting external pathogens for adhesion to the vaginal mucosa. Additionally, these bacteria defend against pathogens by generating antimicrobial compounds like bacteriocin. In vitro analysis of vaginal fluids from five women demonstrated activity against non-resident bacterial species, including Escherichia coli and Group B Streptococcus. This protection against Group B Streptococcus holds particular significance for pregnant women, as it commonly colonizes the vagina via the gastrointestinal tract, elevating the risk of preterm delivery, neonatal meningitis, and fetal death. Moreover, it may lead to asymptomatic bacteriuria, urinary tract infections, upper genital tract infections, and postpartum endometritis.

=== Nail care products ===
Nail care products include nail cutters, nail files and cuticle creams. They are used to maintain and enhance the appearance of nails and promote healthy nail growth.

=== Eye care products ===
These include artificial tears or lubricating eye drops to moisturize and soothe the eyes and provide relief from dryness, irritation, and discomfort due to dry eye syndrome or environmental factors; contact lens solutions for cleaning, disinfecting, and storing contact lenses and help remove debris, bacteria, and protein buildup from the lenses, eye drops (typically containing anti-histamines and mast cell stabilizers) for allergies to provide relief from itching, redness, and watering caused by allergic reactions; eye creams, which are special moisturizers for the sensitive skin around the eyes, contain ingredients such as hyaluronic acid, peptides, and antioxidants to hydrate, firm, and reduce the appearance of fine lines and wrinkles; eye serums for puffiness, dark circles, and signs of aging, typically containing ingredients like caffeine, retinol, or vitamin C; eyelid cleansers to clean and soothe the eyelids and eyelashes by removing debris, excess oil, and bacteria and in this way help alleviate eyelid inflammation, blepharitis, or dry eye syndrome; eye masks, which are gel or sheet masks placed over closed eyes to provide cooling, soothing, and hydrating effects, and to help reduce puffiness, relieve tired eyes, and improve the appearance of dark circles.

=== Anal hygiene products ===
Anal hygiene products include toilet papers, bidets and bidet showers. For babies, wet wipes are used. These are used to keep the anal area clean from fecal remains and harmful bacteria after defecation.

== Forms and additives ==
Personal care products can come in different physical forms such as liquid solutions, solid bars and sticks, semi-solid or emulsion-based mixtures, powders, aerosols, oils, gels, scrubs and sheets. They may contain colorants, fragrances, emollients, surfactants, humectants, thickeners, stabilizers, preservatives, pH adjusters and pH buffers, silicones, chelating agents, film-forming agents, natural extracts, antioxidants, disinfectants and antimicrobials along with the actual product.

In addition, there are personal care tools such as toothbrushes, hairbrushes and combs, manual razors and electric shavers, tweezers, nail clippers and files, sponges, pads, scrubs, etc. which help apply the aforementioned products or have their own functions.

== Hotel application ==
Typical toiletries offered at many hotels include:

- small bar of soap
- disposable shower cap
- small bottle of moisturizer
- small bottles of shampoo and conditioner
- toilet paper
- box of facial tissue
- face towels
- disposable shoe polishing cloth
- Toothpaste
- Toothbrush
- Cologne

== Corporations ==
Some of the major corporations in the personal care industry are:

- Alberto-Culver
- Amorepacific
- Amway
- Avon
- Beiersdorf
- Colgate-Palmolive
- Combe Incorporated
- Coty Inc
- Dyson
- Edgewell Personal Care
- Essity
- Henkel
- ITC Limited
- Johnson & Johnson
- Kaya Skin Clinic
- Kimberly-Clark
- L'Oreal
- Natura
- O Boticário
- Pechoin
- Procter & Gamble
- Purell
- PZ Cussons
- Reckitt Benckiser
- Remington Products
- Revlon
- Shiseido
- Unilever

Other corporations, such as pharmacies (e.g. CVS/pharmacy, Walgreens) primarily retail in personal care rather than manufacture personal care products themselves.

== Environmental impacts ==
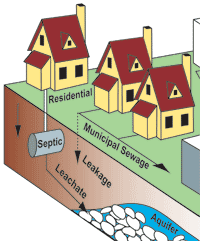
Methods of PPCP entry into the environment from residential homes via septic and sewage systems

The environmental effects of pharmaceutical and personal care products (PPCPs) has been of concern since at least the 1990s. PPCPs include substances used by individuals for personal health or cosmetic reasons and the products used by agribusiness to boost growth or health of livestock. More than twenty million tons of PPCPs are produced every year. The European Union has declared that pharmacological residues with the potential for contamination of water and the soil are "priority substances".^{[3]}

PPCPs have been detected in waters throughout the world. More research is needed to evaluate the risks of toxicity, persistence, and bioaccumulation, but current research shows that personal care products affect the environment and other species, such as coral reefs and fish. PPCPs encompass environmental persistent pharmaceutical pollutants (EPPPs) and are one type of persistent organic pollutants. They are not removed in conventional sewage treatment plants but require a fourth treatment stage which not many plants have.

In 2022, the most comprehensive study of pharmacological pollution of the world's rivers showed that it threatens "environmental and/or human health in more than a quarter of the studied locations". It investigated 1052 sampling sites along 258 rivers in 104 countries, representing pollution of rivers serving 470 million people. It showed that "the most contaminated sites were in low- to middle-income countries and were associated with areas with poor wastewater and waste management infrastructure and pharmaceutical product manufacture" and listed the most frequently detected and concentrated pharmaceutical products.

== See also ==
- Cosmetics
- Sachet
- Toiletry kit
