= Aquaculture of sea sponges =

Farming of sea sponges

Sea sponge aquaculture is the process of farming sea sponges under controlled conditions. It has been conducted in the world's oceans for centuries using a number of aquaculture techniques. There are many factors such as light, salinity, pH, dissolved oxygen and the accumulation of waste products that influence the growth rate of sponges. The benefits of sea sponge aquaculture are realised as a result of its ease of establishment, minimum infrastructure requirements and the potential to be used as a source of income for populations living in developing countries. Sea sponges are produced on a commercial scale to be used as bath sponges or to extract biologically active compounds which are found in certain sponge species. Techniques such as the rope and mesh bag method are used to culture sponges independently or within an integrated multi-trophic aquaculture system setting. One of the only true sustainable sea sponges cultivated in the world occur in the region of Micronesia, with a number of growing and production methods used to ensure and maintain the continued sustainability of these farmed species.

== History ==
More than 8000 species of sea sponges live in oceanic and freshwater habitats. Sponge fishing historically has been an important and lucrative industry, with yearly catches from years 1913 to 1938 regularly exceeding 181 tonnes and generating over 1 million U.S. dollars. However, this demand for sea sponges has seen catch rates peak and in 2003 the demand for bath sponges was 2,127 tonnes, with global production from harvesting only meeting a quarter of that amount.

Early aquaculture research into optimizing techniques for sea sponge aquaculture used a number of farming methods. However, commercial sponge farming was met with severe resistance and interference from sponge fishermen, who believed that their continued income was under threat. The opposition by commercial sponge farmers resulted in a low market penetration and poor consumer adoption of aquacultured sponge products.

== Benefits ==
The benefits of commercial sponge aquaculture are apparent for those living in developing countries. In these countries, sponge aquaculture is both an easy and profitable business, which benefits the local community and environment through minimising both harvesting pressure on wild stocks and environmental damage.

=== Simple ===
Growing sponges is a simple process and requires little specialist knowledge. Furthermore, the ease of sponge aquaculture means that a whole family can be involved in the production process. This results in a profitable family business which conforms to traditional discourses of "family farms", increasing the likelihood of sea sponge aquaculture adoption. In addition, it is common for sea sponge farms to be located close to family homes allowing for continual access, monitoring, modification and work to be completed on the farm.

=== Income generation ===
Sea sponge aquaculture also provides families with a continuous source of income year-round, which can be undertaken as a full-time commitment, or as a part-time job to supplement an existing income.

== Uses ==
=== Bath sponges ===
The last two decades have seen a renewed interest in the potential for sponge aquaculture to contribute to supplying the growing global demand for bath sponges. Bath sponges are the most common use of aquacultured sea sponge today. Bath sponges can be defined as any sponge species possessing only spongin fibers – which are springy fibres made from collagen protein.

Commercial uses for bath sponges range from cosmetic, bath, or industrial purposes, with the quality of the sponge based on analysing the quality of the sponge skeleton, with those possessing soft, durable and elastic fibres commanding the highest price.

=== Bioactive uses ===
The presence of secondary metabolites produced by symbiotic microorganisms within the sponge, enhances its growth and survival. Thousands of sponge derived secondary metabolites have been successfully isolated from sponges, with many metabolites having potential medicinal properties, such as cytotoxicity, anti-inflammatory and anti-viral activity. Therefore, they have significant potential within the pharmaceutical industry as a means of generating novel drugs. These secondary metabolites, however, are often only present in trace amounts, with the only methods to use these metabolites as therapeutics depending on the scale up of the compounds via chemical synthesis or aquaculture.

=== Menstrual sponges ===
Sea sponges are sometimes used as a menstrual product. They have been suggested as an insertable tampon alternative since the 1980s, and are sometimes sold as reusable products. Early studies found them contaminated with mould, bacteria and sand, and the US Food and Drug Administration has not approved any sea sponges for sale as menstrual products in the US; current assessments of their safety differ, and synthetic single-use alternatives are available in Australia and European Union countries, often called "soft tampons".

== Factors that affect the growth of sponges ==
=== Salinity, pH, temperature and light ===
Sea sponges should be cultured at a salinity of 35ppt (salinity of seawater). Hypersalinity (high salt concentrations) in the immediate environment surrounding a sponge will dehydrate sponge cells, whereas a hyposaline (low salt concentration) environment dilutes the intracellular environment of the sponge. The pH of water must match that of seawater (pH 7.8–8.4) in order for sponge production to be maximized. Sponges are sensitive to temperature, and extreme fluctuations in ambient temperature can negatively affect the health of sea sponges. High temperatures lead to crashes in sponge cultures. Symbiotic bacteria that normally inhabit sea sponges start reproducing at an unsustainable rate when ambient temperature of the water increases by a few degrees. These bacteria then attack and destroy the sponge cells and tissue. It has been suggested that sponges should be cultured at water temperatures slightly below the ambient water temperature in the region the sponge has been originally isolated from.

Photosynthetic endosymbionts inhabit many tropical sponges, and these require light to survive. Certain sponges as a result depend on light availability and intensity to achieve their nutritional needs. In some species however, light may lead to growth inhibition as they are sensitive to ultraviolet radiation. Other than when the sponge has associated photosynthetic bacteria, optimal sea sponge growth occurs in dark conditions.

=== Dissolved oxygen ===
Dissolved oxygen is absorbed through the aquiferous system. Oxygen in sea sponges is consumed at rates which range from 0.2–0.25 μmol O_{2}h^{−1}/cm^{3} of sponge volume. Demosponges maintained under laboratory conditions can also tolerate hypoxic conditions, for brief periods, which could reflect their adaptability to dissolved oxygen.

=== Waste removal ===
In closed culture systems some species of sponge may produce bioactive and cytotoxic metabolites which may rapidly build up and inhibit further sponge growth. However, biofilters are likely to be ineffective at removing secondary metabolites expelled from the sponge. Adsorption methods where biomolecules adhere to an adsorbate are likely to be an effective way of removing these compounds.

=== Diseases ===
Bath sponge disease outbreaks are often severe, having the potential to destroy both wild and aquacultured sponge populations. The underlying factors that result in disease outbreaks may be due to causative agents such as viruses, fungi, cyanobacteria and bacterial strains.

=== Site selection ===
When choosing a sea sponge aquaculture location, factors that promote growth and survival of the cultured sponge species must be considered. Sponges rely greatly on a passive flow of water to provide food, such as bacteria and microalgae, thus good water flow increases growth and quality of sponges. Higher than normal water flow rates could potentially damage farmed sponges. An ideal location for a sea sponge farm would be in an area that is sheltered, but which receives ample water flow and food availability to optimise sponge growth.

== Methods of cultivation ==
=== The use of explants ===
Sponge aquaculture for spongin or metabolite production capitalises on the high regenerative abilities of the totipotent sponge cells by using explants (cut pieces of a parent sponge, which will then regrow into a full sponge) as a means of culturing sponges. Sponges have indeterminate growth, with maximum growth determined through environmental constraints rather than genetics. During the initial establishment of a farm, sponge explants will be chosen by their phenotypic characteristics of fast growth and high quality spongin or metabolites.

=== Integrated multi-trophic aquaculture ===
Intensive marine aquaculture in the last decade has increased considerably and resulted in considerable adverse environmental impacts. Large discharge volumes of organic matter from uneaten feed and excretory waste from aquacultured species has resulted in high levels of nutrients within coastal waters. Large quantities of nitrogen (~ 75%) excreted from bivalves, salmon and shrimp, enter into the coastal environment, with the potential to develop algal blooms, and reduce dissolved oxygen in the water.

An integrated aquaculture system consists of a number of species at different trophic levels of the food chain. Thus waste generating (fed organisms) such as fish and shrimp are coupled with extractive organisms such as abalone, sponges or sea urchins, as a mechanism of removing excess nutrient matter from the water column. Sea sponges have a distinct advantage as an extractive organism in an integrated multi-trophic aquaculture system, as they have the potential of acting as a bioremediator to remove both pathogenic bacteria and organic matter. The sponge Hymeniacidon perlevis has exhibited an excellent ability to remove total organic carbon (TOC) from seawater under integrated aquaculture conditions, and could be a potentially useful bioremediation tool for aquaculture systems in regions where water pollution is high. Furthermore, the organic enrichment originating from fish farmed in the vicinity may stimulate sponge growth, resulting in more efficient sea sponge aquaculture.

=== Bath sponge aquaculture ===
Many commercial sea sponge farms situate their aquaculture sites in deeper waters (>5 m), to maximise the number of sponge explants that can be grown and increase productivity. Two main methods of bath sponge aquaculture have been trialled with sponges either being grown on a rope or inside a mesh bag.

==== Rope method ====
Survival for sponges farmed on ropes is generally lower as unrecoverable damage occurs to the explant when 'threading' onto the rope takes place. Furthermore, sponges cultured on the rope have the potential to be torn off the rope during storms as water flow increases significantly, or grow away from the rope and form an unmarketable, low value, characteristic doughnut shaped sponge. Differences in sponge growth and health do occur within species characterised by variations in regenerative ability, susceptibility to infection after cutting, hardiness and growth potential.

==== Mesh bag method ====
Lower levels of damage in some species of sponges cultured via mesh bags can lead to higher levels of survival. Growth rates may be decreased as mesh strands on the bags may decrease water flow, limiting food availability. The accumulation of biofouling agents such as bryozoans, ascidians and algae on the mesh may further limit water flow. Thin mesh strands with large gaps and a well-positioned site may act as a means to mitigate against biofouling and reduced flow rates.

==== Combination of methods ====
By combining both rope and mesh bag approaches to bath sponge aquaculture in a "nursery period", increases may occur in quality and production. In the nursery period method, sponges are initially cultivated in mesh bags until the explants have healed and regenerated to efficiently filter water. The regenerated explants are transferred onto rope to promote optimal growth till harvesting. This strategy is labour-intensive and costly, with growth rates and survival found to be no greater than when farming occurs solely via the mesh bag method.

A more economically viable method for cultivating bath sponges would be transferring sponges to larger mesh bags as sponge growth occurs to enable adequate water flow and nutrient sequestration.

==== Bath sponge aquaculture production in Micronesia ====
Bath sponges are currently being produced using the sponge Coscinoderma matthewsi with production of about 12,000 sponges, sold locally to residents and tourists in Pohnpei, Federated States of Micronesia. These sponges are one of the only true sustainably farmed sea sponges in the world. The sponges are farmed via the rope method, with low investment costs of a few thousand dollars for farming and maintenance equipment, producing 100% natural sponges with no harsh chemicals added during processing.

Aquaculture production of C. matthewsi sponges was undertaken by the Marine and Environmental Research Institute of Pohnpei (MERIP), to try and generate a sustainable income for local community residents with few options to earn money. The sponges take approximately two years to reach harvestable size, with free divers routinely removing seaweed and biofouling agents by hand. These sponges are processed through natural processes, where they are left to air dry and then placed in baskets and returned to the lagoon where they were grown. This process removes all the organic matter within the sponge leaving behind the final bath sponge product. Further processing occurs by softening the sponge, but no bleaches, acids or colorants are used.

=== Bioactive sponge aquaculture ===
Research into farming sea sponges for bioactive metabolites occurs in the Mediterranean, Indo-Pacific, and South Pacific regions. The main goals are to optimise bioactive production methods, aquaculture processes and environmental conditions to maximise their production.

==== New methods ====
In the aquaculture for bioactives, the final explant shape is not of concern, allowing for additional production methods to be utilized. New methods of bioactive cultivation include the "mesh array method" which utilises the water column to vertically hang a mesh tube with single explants held in alternating pockets.

The number of sponges required to aquaculture bioactives is reduced as sponge secondary metabolites can be repetitively harvested for many years, decreasing the costs and infrastructure required. The few sponges selected for metabolite production would have high production rates for the target metabolite to optimise production and profits.

==== Factors affecting secondary metabolite production ====
A number of factors affect sponge metabolite production, with metabolite concentration varying greatly between neighbouring explants. Localised differences in light intensity and bio-fouling are physical and biological factors that have been found to significantly affect metabolite biosynthesis in sponges. Changes in environmental factors may alter microbial populations and subsequently affect metabolite biosynthesis.

Understanding the environmental factors that affect metabolite biosynthesis or the ecological role of the metabolite, can be used as a competitive advantage to maximise metabolite production and total yield. For example, if the ecological role of the secondary target metabolite was to deter predators, mimicking predation via wounding the sponge before harvesting may be an efficient technique to maximise metabolite production.

Some sponges producing metabolites grow extremely quickly, suggesting that farming sponges may be a viable alternative to producing bioactives that at present cannot be chemically synthesised. Although sponge farming for bioactives is more lucrative owing to its higher value-adding properties, there are several challenges that are not present when aquaculturing bath sponges, such as the high costs associated with metabolite extraction and purification.
