= Antiseptic douche =

The antiseptic douche was one of the most popular forms of birth control in the early 1900s. It was similar in function to the conventional vaginal douche, but was filled with a chemical mixture instead of saline. The purpose of using a chemical mixture was to interrupt the path of sperm and stop a woman from getting pregnant.

== Success rate in preventing unwanted pregnancy ==
“This class of case is so common that I feel like apologizing for referring to it... [she] had given birth to five children... And the fear of another pregnancy became an obsession to her.” Women were desperate and would go to great lengths to prevent an unwanted pregnancy. The antiseptic douche, in fact, had one of the lowest success rates, somewhere around 20-30%. The majority of women who used the douche often found themselves pregnant in the long run. However, regardless of the high failure rate, demand was high. Because the products could not be advertised as birth control products, the companies were not responsible to communicate the success rate or the health risks associated with using an antiseptic douche. “Clamoring for a larger share of the hygiene market, manufactures did their utmost to ensure their product would be one women would want to try.” Later research actually shows that douching can lead to pregnancy, in that the solution can push the sperm farther up into the body and into the cervix, or in most cases do nothing because even when used correctly and immediately after sexual intercourse, the sperm has already reached the egg.

== Health risks ==
Modern research shows douching is very unhealthy for a woman's hygiene. It unbalances a woman's pH, which is self-cleaning. Many antiseptic douche products being sold at the time contained very strong chemicals, such as mercury, and packaging provided little information on how to reduce the effect of the chemicals. Many women felt that the stronger the mixture, the more likely it would be to prevent pregnancy, which increased the health risks. In addition to mercury, there were various other chemicals being used as birth control, and these different solutions could result in burns to a woman's vagina, ectopic pregnancies, and other serious effects that could potentially lead to hospitalization.
