= Douche =

Device used to introduce a stream of water into the body

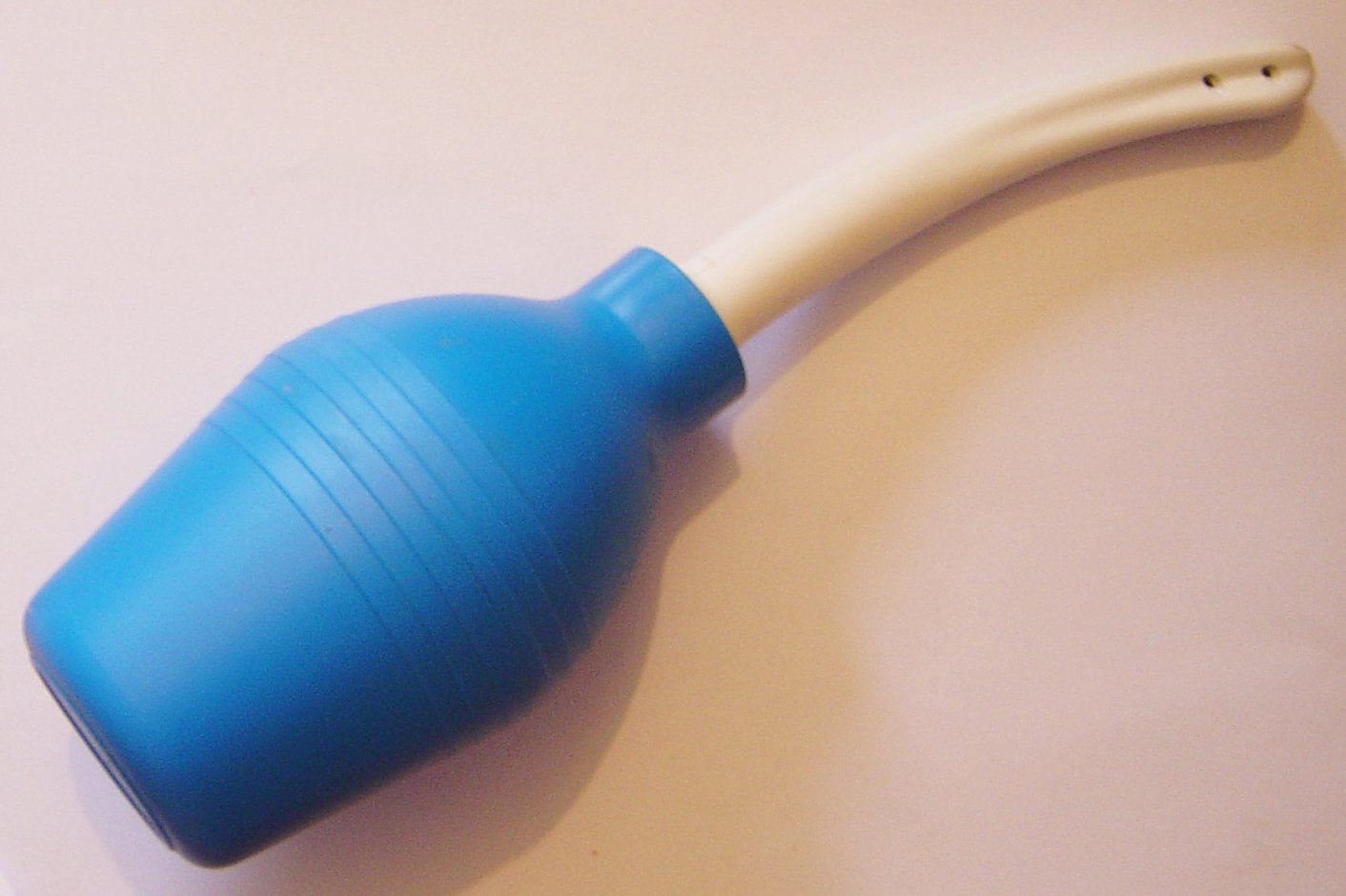
- A vaginal bulb syringe with lateral holes near the tip of the nozzle
- Pronunciation: /duːʃ/
- ICD-9-CM: 96.44
- MeSH: D044364

A douche is a device used to introduce a stream of water into the body for medical or hygienic reasons, or for the stream of water itself. Douche usually refers to vaginal irrigation, the rinsing of the vagina, but it can also refer to the rinsing of any body cavity. A douche bag is a piece of equipment for douching—a bag for holding the fluid used in douching. To avoid transferring intestinal bacteria to the vagina, the same bag must not be used for both an enema and a vaginal douche.

Douching after sexual intercourse is not an effective form of birth control. Additionally, douching is associated with a number of health problems, including cervical cancer, pelvic inflammatory disease, endometritis, and increased risk of sexually transmitted infections.

== Etymology ==
The word's first known use is in 1766. Douche came into English via French, from Italian: doccia "conduit pipe" and docciare "pour by drops" to douche, from doccia water pipe, probably back-formation from doccione conduit, from Latin: duction-, ductio means of conveying water, from ducere to lead. In French today it means shower, as it does in many European languages.

== Overview ==
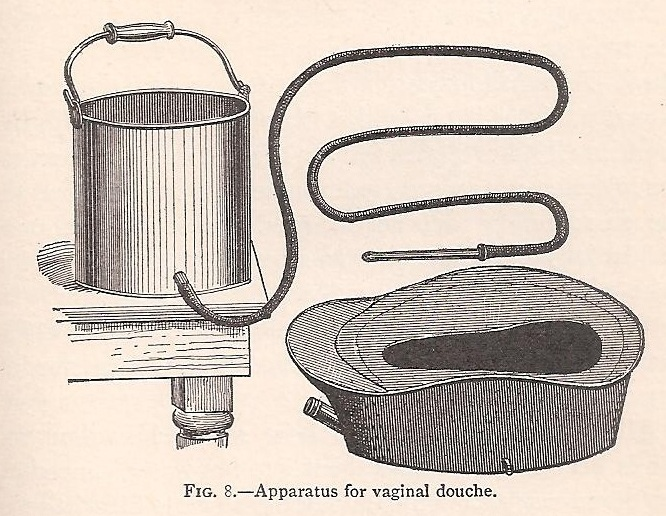
Vaginal douche apparatus with a five-quart tank, from a 1905 nursing text

Vaginal douches may consist of water, water mixed with vinegar, or even antiseptic chemicals. Douching has been touted as having a number of supposed but unproven benefits. In addition to promising to clean the vagina of unwanted odors, it can also be used by women whose partners wish to avoid contact with menstrual blood while having sexual intercourse during menstruation. In the past, douching was also used after intercourse as a method of birth control, though it is not effective.

Many health-care professionals state that douching is dangerous, as it interferes with both the vagina's normal self-cleaning and with the natural bacterial culture of the vagina, and it might spread or introduce infections. Douching is implicated in a wide variety of dangers, including: adverse pregnancy outcomes including ectopic pregnancy, low birth weight, preterm labor, preterm birth, and chorioamnionitis; serious gynecologic outcomes, including increased risk of cervical cancer, pelvic inflammatory disease, endometritis, and increased risk for sexually transmitted infections, including HIV; it also predisposes women to develop bacterial vaginosis (BV), which is further associated with adverse pregnancy outcomes and increased risk of sexually transmitted infections. Due to this, the U.S. Department of Health and Human Services strongly discourages douching, citing the risks of irritation, bacterial vaginosis, and pelvic inflammatory disease (PID). Frequent douching with water may result in an imbalance of the pH of the vagina, and thus may put women at risk for possible vaginal infections, especially yeast infections.

In May 2003, a randomized, controlled, multi-center study was conducted with 1827 women ages 18–44 who were regular users of a douche product and who had been treated recently for a sexually transmitted bacterial infection or bacterial vaginosis. Women were randomly assigned to use either a newly designed and marketed douche product or a soft cloth towelette. There was little or no indication of a greater risk of PID among women assigned to use the douche product (versus soft cloth towelette).

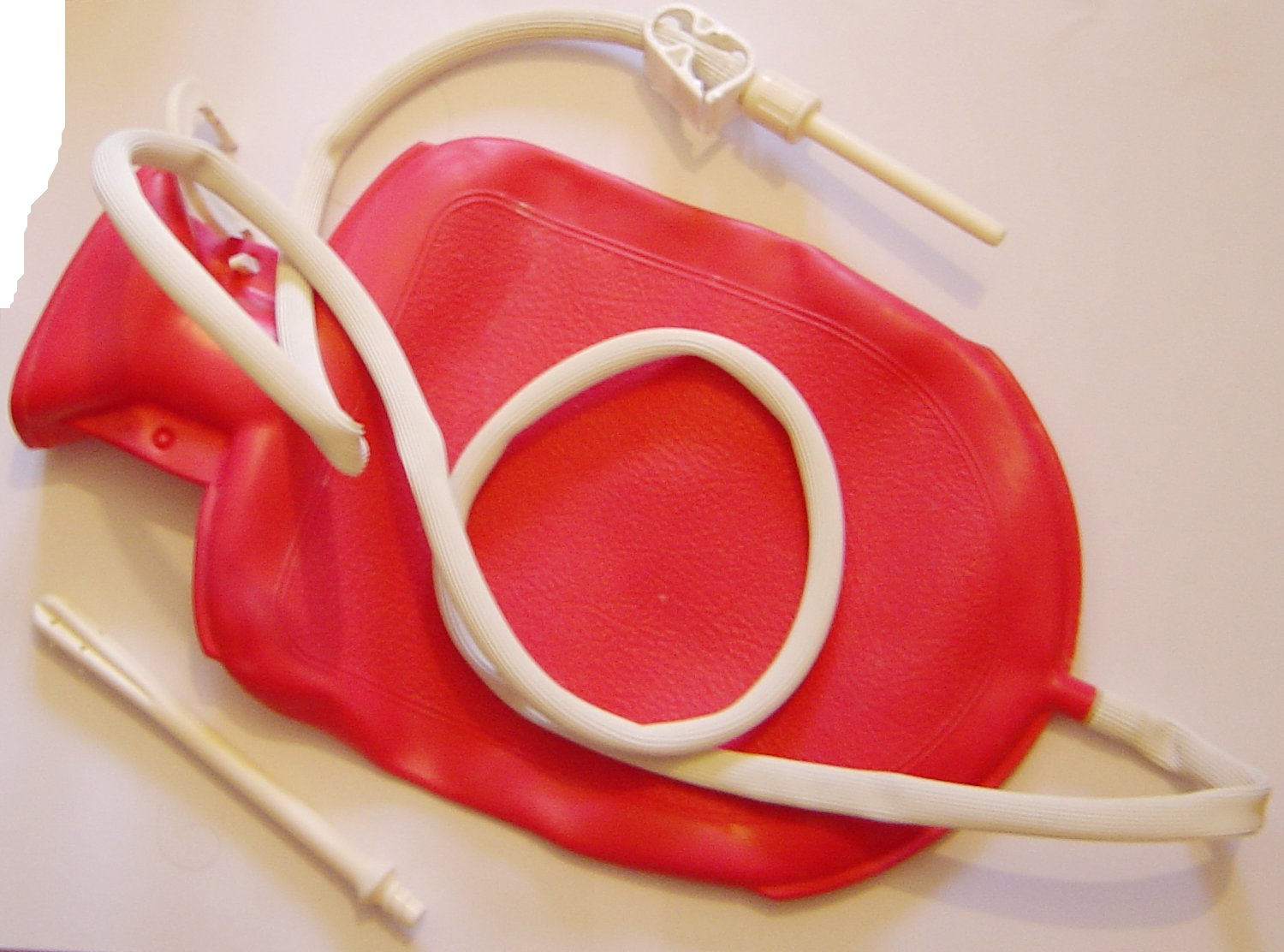
The "fountain syringe" is used for douching, by replacing the attached enema nozzle with the vaginal nozzle (shown bottom left). The vaginal nozzle is longer and thicker and has lateral holes.

Antiseptics used during douching disturb the natural balance of bacteria in the vagina and can cause infections. Unclean douching equipment may introduce foreign bodies into the vagina. Douching may also wash bacteria into the uterus and fallopian tubes, causing fertility problems. For these reasons, the practice of douching is now strongly discouraged except when ordered by a physician for medical reasons.

Douching after intercourse is estimated to reduce the chances of conception by only about 30%. In comparison, proper male condom use reduces the chance of conception by as much as 98%. In some cases douching may force the ejaculate further into the vagina, increasing the chance of pregnancy. A review of studies by researchers at the University of Rochester Medical Center (N.Y.) showed that women who douched regularly and later became pregnant had higher rates of ectopic pregnancy, infections, and low birth weight infants than women who only douched occasionally or who never douched.

A 1995 survey quoted in the University of Rochester study found that 27% of U.S. women age 15 to 44 douched regularly, but that douching was more common among African-American women (over 50%) than among white women (21%), and frequent douching contributes to more frequent bacterial vaginosis among African-American women than the average.

Medical doctor Harriet Hall writes that not only can douching change the pH of the vagina and lead to infections, "There is no need ... to cleanse the vagina. It cleanses itself".

== Slang uses ==
Douchebag and its variants, or simply douche, are pejorative terms referring to an arrogant, obnoxious, or despicable person. The slang usage of the term originated in the 1960s.

== See also ==
- Antiseptic douche
- Rectal douching
- Bidet
- Enema
- Sexual slang
- Therapeutic irrigation
