= Feminine hygiene =

Personal care for the female reproductive system

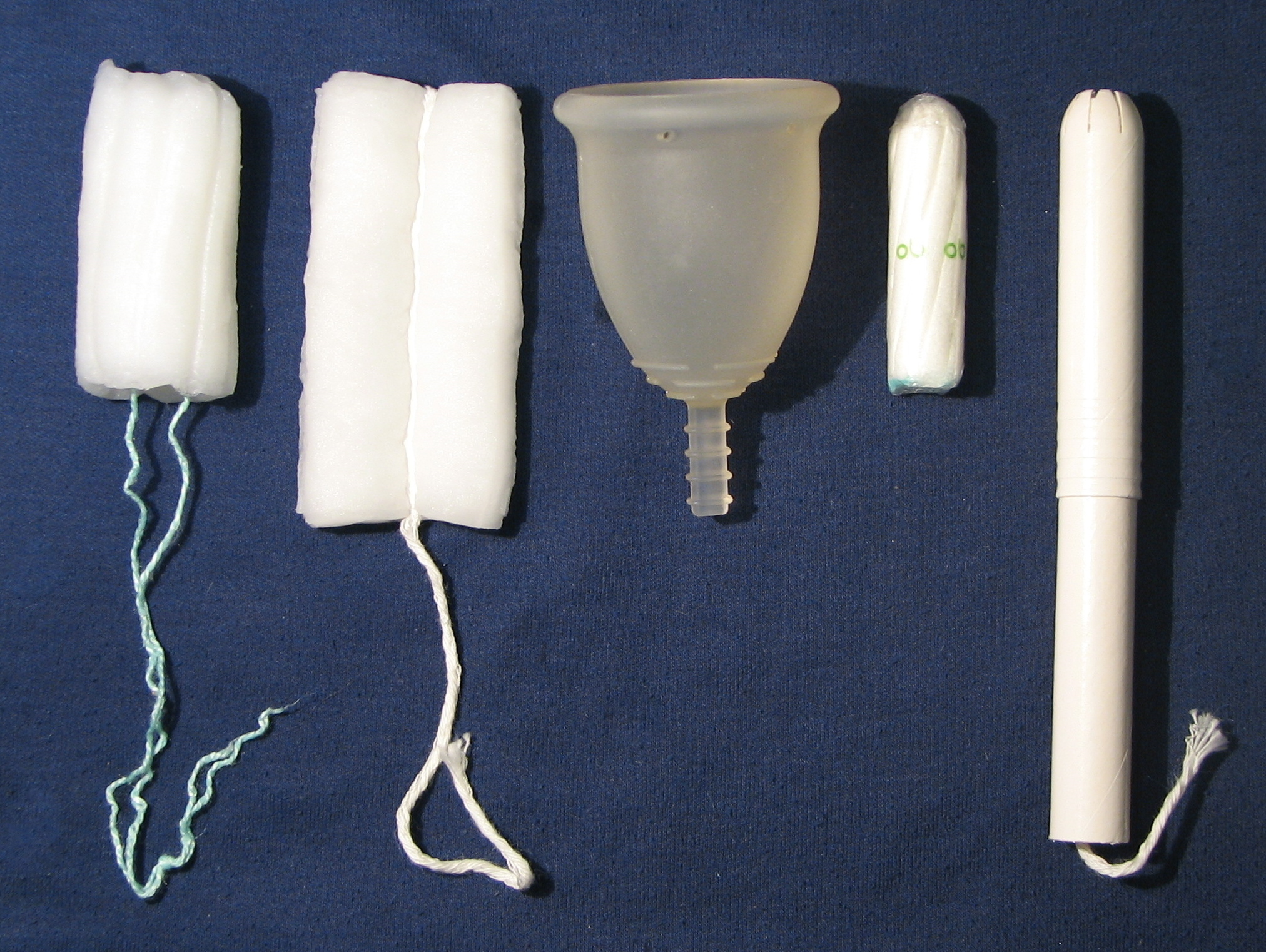
Various tampons, including one with an applicator, and menstrual cup

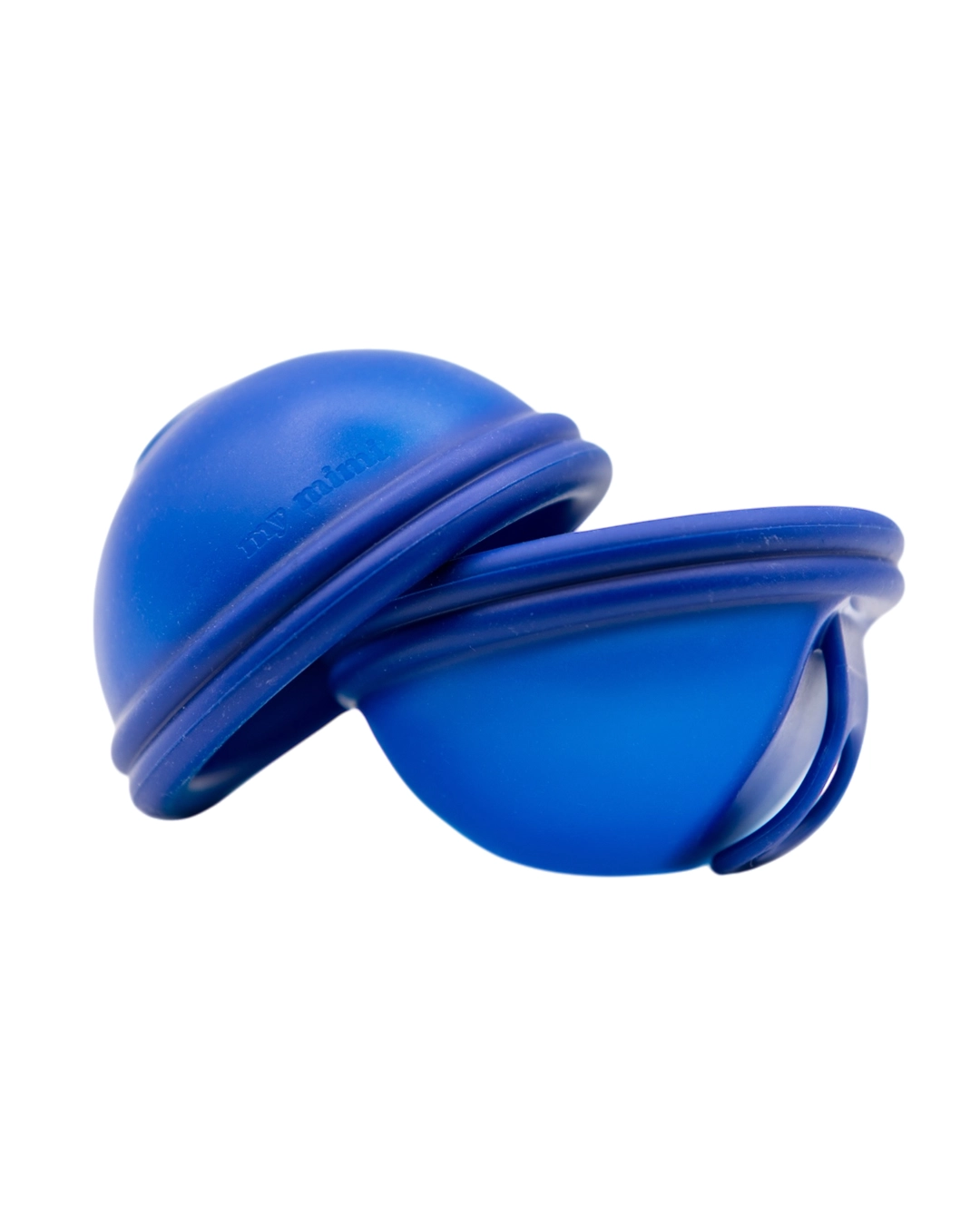
A reusable menstrual disc

Feminine hygiene products are personal care products used for women's hygiene during menstruation, vaginal discharge, or other bodily functions related to the vulva and vagina. Products that are used during menstruation may also be called menstrual hygiene products, including menstrual pads, tampons, pantyliners, menstrual cups, menstrual sponges and period panties.

Feminine hygiene products are either disposable or reusable. Sanitary napkins, tampons, and pantyliners are disposable feminine hygiene products. Menstrual cups, cloth menstrual pads, period panties, and sponges are reusable feminine hygiene products.

Feminine hygiene products also include products meant to cleanse the vulva or vagina, such as douches, feminine wipes, and soap.

== Types ==
=== Menstrual hygiene products ===
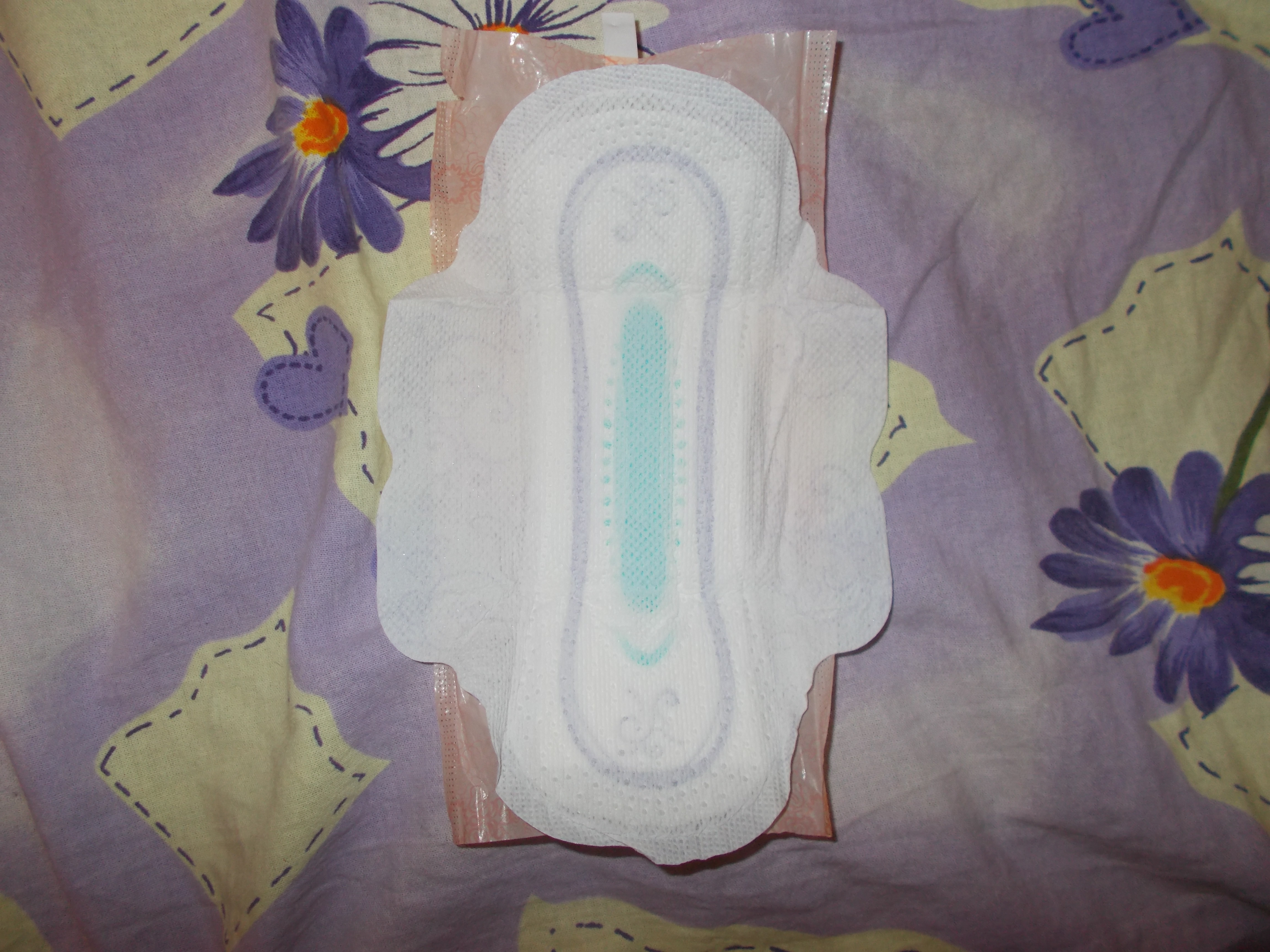
A menstrual pad with wings

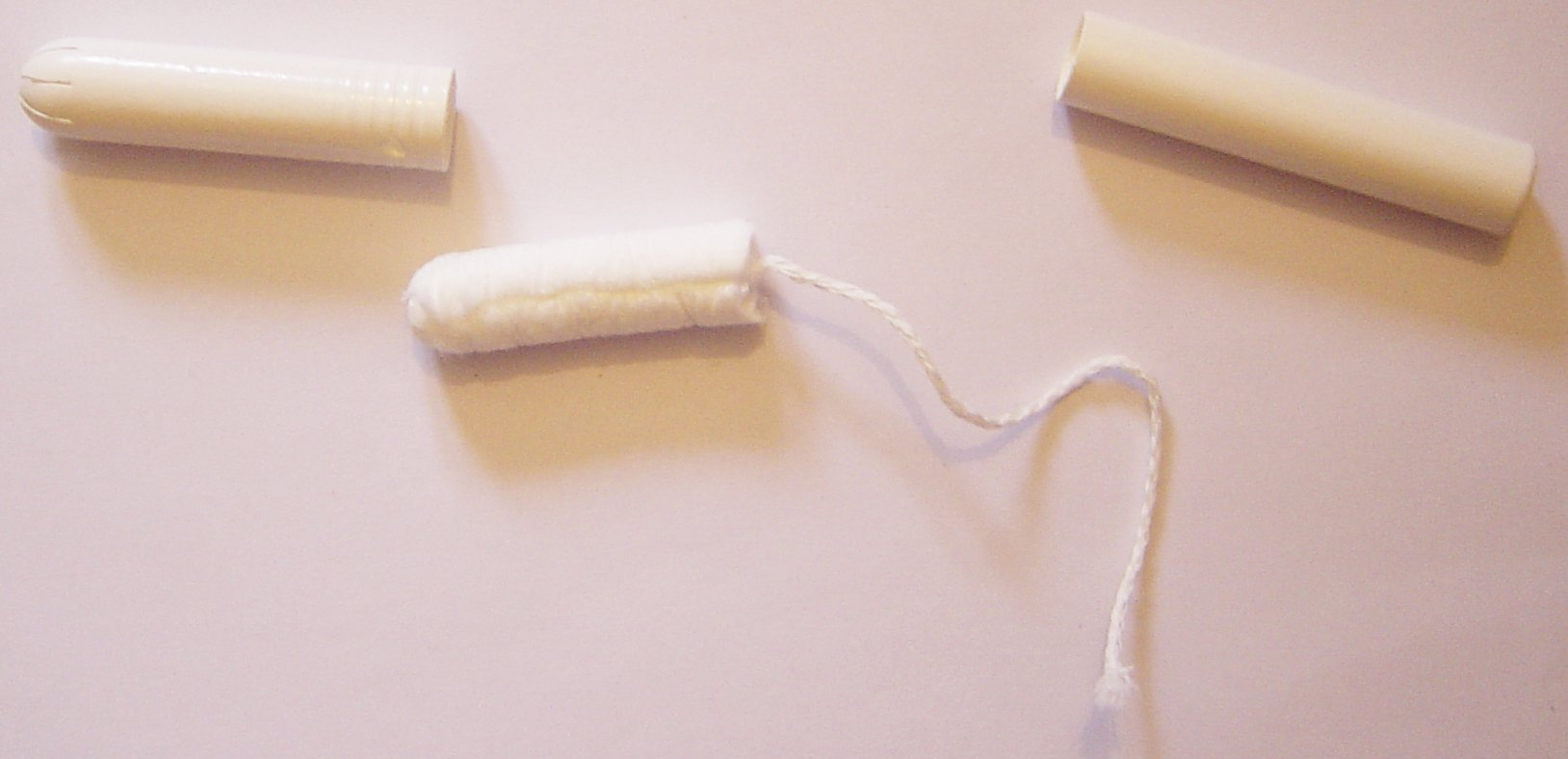
The elements of a tampon with applicator. Left: the bigger tube ("penetrator"). Center: cotton tampon with attached string. Right: the narrower tube.

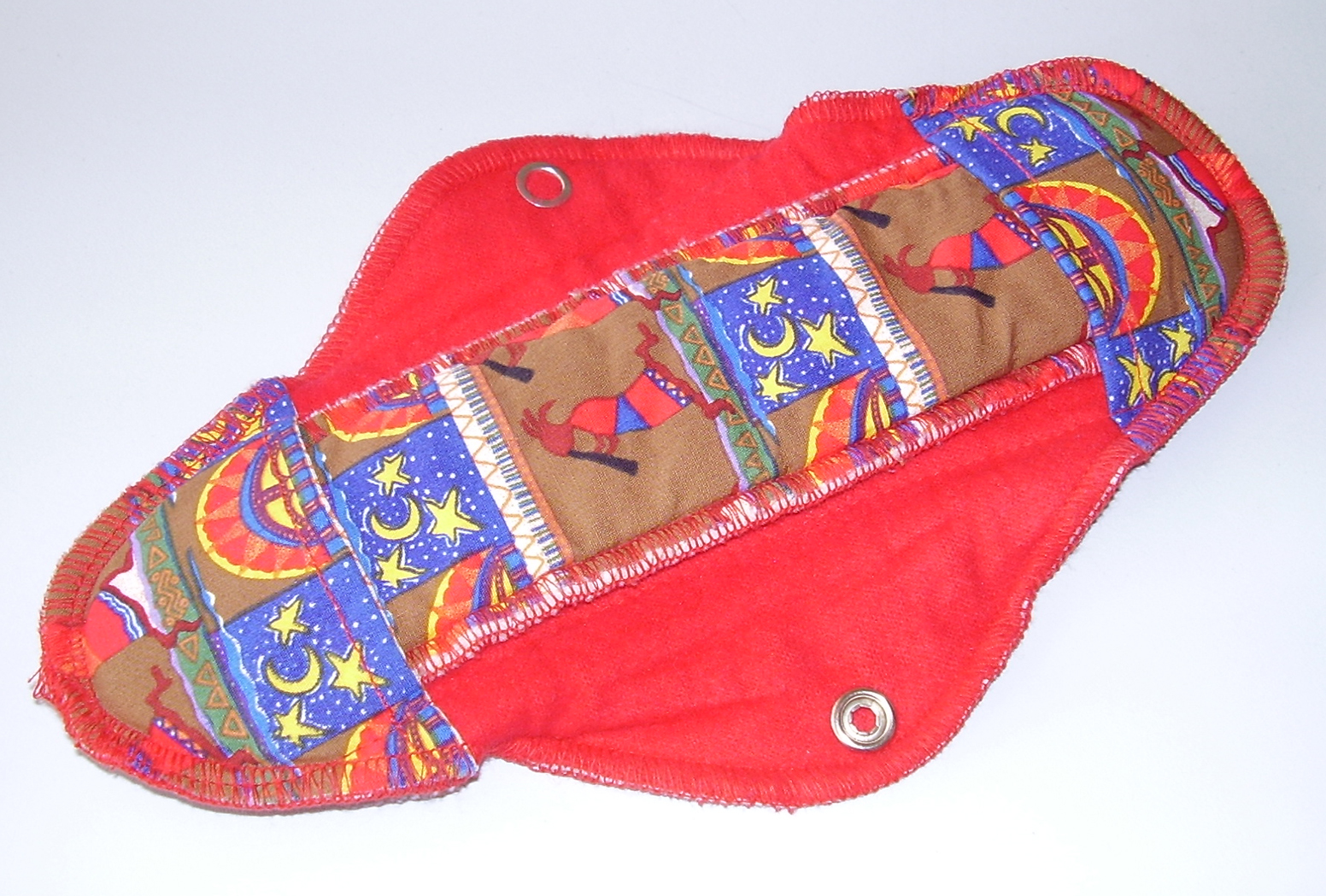
Reusable cloth menstrual pad with Kokopelli motif.

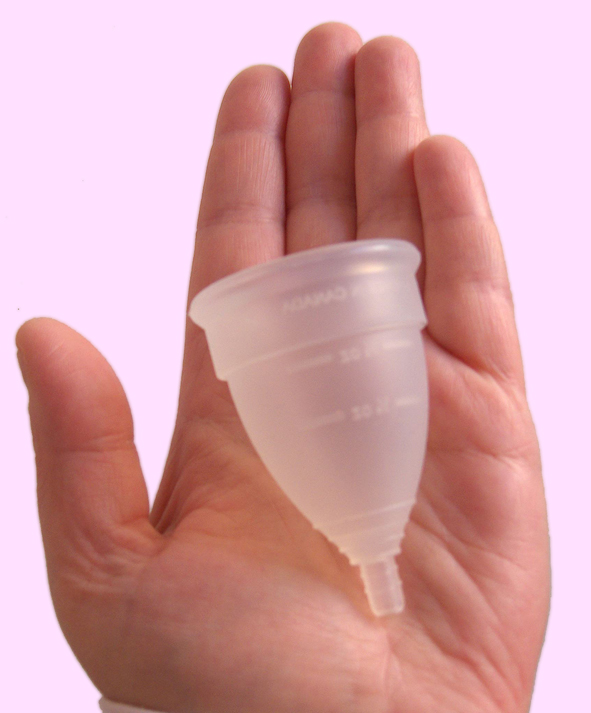
A menstrual cup

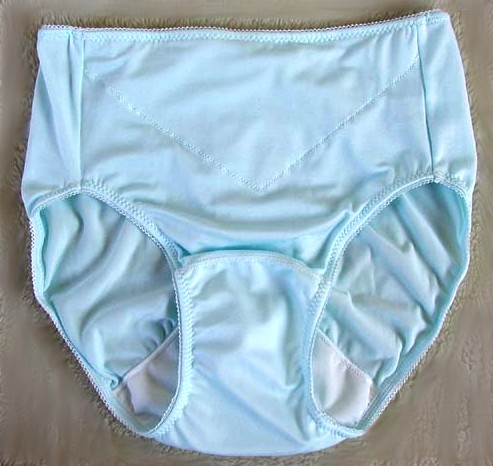
Menstrual panty

Disposable:

- Menstrual pad: Made of absorbent material that is worn on the inside of underwear to absorb a heavier menstrual flow. They are made of cellulose and are available in many different absorbencies and lengths. They may have wings and/or an adhesive backing to hold the pad in place.
- Pantyliner: Similar to a menstrual pad, they are smaller, thinner and used for lighter periods, intermittent bleeding and vaginal discharge, or as a supplement to a tampon.
- Tampon: Inserted inside the vagina to absorb menstrual blood, can also be used while swimming, available in different levels of absorbency.

Reusable:

- Menstrual cup: Made of silicone, natural rubber, or plastic; is inserted inside the vagina to catch blood and/or uterine lining. Most are reusable: they are emptied when full and can be washed or boiled.
- Cloth menstrual pad: Worn inside underwear; can be made of materials such as cotton, flannel or terry cloth.
- Period underwear (AKA period panties): Can refer to either underwear that keeps pads in place, or absorbent underwear that can take the place of tampons and pads.
- Menstrual sponge: Inserted like a tampon or cup and worn inside the body.
- Towel: large reusable piece of cloth, most often used at night (if nothing else is available), placed between legs to absorb menstrual flow.
- Menstrual disc: is a reusable, medical-grade silicone product designed to collect menstrual fluid for up to 12 hours. Unlike traditional pads and tampons, it sits comfortably higher in the vaginal canal, offering a discreet, leak-free period experience. Safe for IUD users, cost-effective, and sustainable for over five years, often delivering a modern, eco-conscious solution for period care.

=== Cleansing products ===
- Douches: A fluid used to flush out the inside of the vagina.
- Feminine wipes: A moist, sometimes scented cloth used to wipe the vulva.

Feminine hygiene products that are meant to cleanse may lead to allergic reaction and irritation, as the vagina naturally flushes out bacteria. Many health professionals advise against douching because it can change the balance of vaginal flora and acidity. Research shows that the vagina's features allow it to naturally defend itself from harmful microorganisms. The innate defense mechanisms against vulvovaginal infections encompass the normal vaginal flora, acidic vaginal pH, and vaginal discharge. Resident bacteria play a crucial role in maintaining an acidic pH and outcompeting external pathogens for adhesion to the vaginal mucosa. Additionally, these bacteria defend against pathogens by generating antimicrobial compounds like bacteriocin. In vitro analysis of vaginal fluids from five women demonstrated activity against non-resident bacterial species, including Escherichia coli and Group B Streptococcus. This protection against Group B Streptococcus holds particular significance for pregnant women, as it commonly colonizes the vagina via the gastrointestinal tract, elevating the risk of preterm delivery, neonatal meningitis, and fetal death. Moreover, it may lead to asymptomatic bacteriuria, urinary tract infections, upper genital tract infections, and postpartum endometritis.

== Environmental impact ==
The environmental impact of each product varies enormously: In a lifetime, a menstruating woman in developed countries can use between 5,000 and 15,000 pads and tampons creating about 400 pounds of packaging.

Tampons may have a higher environmental impact due to the presence of non-biodegradable materials like plastic applicators and synthetic fibers. The most environmentally friendly option is considered to be the menstrual cup.

== Health issues ==
The different products may carry different health risks, some of which might be proven, others speculative.

- Toxic shock syndrome: A rare illness that may occur when tampons are worn for long periods of time, although not directly linked to tampon use but caused by poison linked to bacteria of the Streptococcus pyogenes or Staphylococcus aureus type.
- Irritation: Can be caused by fragrances, neomycin (adhesive on pads), tea tree oil, benzocaine. Inflammation can also be a risk associated with some products.
- Yeast infection: A fungus.
- Bacterial vaginosis: Overgrowth of naturally occurring bacteria in the vagina that leads to a type of vaginal inflammation. The imbalance of bacteria from its natural state has been connected to bacterial vaginosis Bacterial vaginosis manifests as a uniform white/gray layer on the vaginal walls and vulva, accompanied by a fishy odor and a vaginal pH exceeding 4.5. The challenge of recurrence arises from the adaptive mechanisms of the bacteria and the inadequate re-establishment of normal vaginal flora.
- Exposure to chemicals: some period underwear companies (like Thinx, Ruby Love, and Knix) are facing class action lawsuits for products containing harmful toxins like per- and polyfluoroalkyl substances (PFAS) which may be linked to adverse health outcomes like cancer.

== The vulvovaginal area ==
The vulva acts as the initial defense line, shielding the genital tract from infections. Often, contaminants accumulate in the folds of the vulva, and factors like increased moisture, sweating, menstruation, and hormonal fluctuations can impact the growth and balance of microbial species, potentially leading to odor and vulvovaginal infections.

Distinct from other skin areas, vulvar skin exhibits variations in hydration, friction, permeability, and visible irritation. It is more susceptible to topical agents compared to forearm skin due to increased hydration, occlusion, and friction. The non-keratinized vulvar vestibule is likely more permeable than keratinized skin. Notably, genital skin is unique with a thin stratum corneum and large hair follicles, making it easier for microbes and substances to permeate.

The vagina, a fibromuscular canal extending from its external opening in the vulva to the cervix, is primarily composed of smooth muscle covered by a non-keratinized epithelial lining. This lining, until menopause, remains thick, kept moist by fluid from the vaginal wall and mucus from cervical and vestibular glands.

=== Vaginal discharge ===
Before reaching puberty until after menopause, women typically experience a natural and healthy occurrence of vaginal discharge. This discharge comprises bacteria, desquamated epithelial cells shedding from the vaginal walls, along with mucus and fluid (plasma) produced by the cervix and vagina. Throughout the menstrual cycle, the quantity and consistency of the discharge undergo variations. At the start and end of the cycle when estrogen levels are low, the discharge is dense, adhesive, and unwelcoming to sperm. As estrogen levels increase before ovulation, the discharge gradually becomes clearer, more liquid, and stretchier.

== Discrepancies in various ethnic groups ==
Feminine hygiene presents discrepancies in various ethnic groups. Differences in feminine hygiene practices are often associated with varying cultural beliefs and religious customs. Research indicates that Afro-Caribbean immigrants, in contrast to Caucasian women, are more inclined to cleanse the vulva with bubble bath or antiseptic. This practice aligns with the belief in the necessity of thorough body cleansing for health and well-being. Among Orthodox Jewish women, a ritual bath known as mikveh is performed after menstrual periods or childbirth to achieve ritual purity. In the Muslim faith, both men and women partake in a bathing ritual called full ablution (ghusl Janabah) after sexual intercourse or menstruation as a purification practice. In regions like Mozambique and South Africa, certain women opt for internal cleansing of their vaginas using substances such as lemon juice, saltwater, or vinegar with the intention of eliminating vaginal discharge and "treating" sexually transmitted diseases.

A research study involving 500 women in Iran revealed a notable association between bacterial vaginosis and inadequate menstrual and vaginal hygiene practices. Additionally, findings from a household survey conducted by Anand et al. indicated that women employing unhygienic methods during menstruation—excluding sanitary pads or locally prepared napkins—were 1.04 times more likely to report symptoms of reproductive tract infections. Furthermore, these women were 1.3 times more likely to experience abnormal vaginal discharge, encompassing symptoms like itching, vulvar irritation, lower abdomen pain, pain during urination or defecation, and low back pain. In another investigation, findings revealed that women engaging in the use of bubble bath on the vulva exhibited a twofold increase in the likelihood of experiencing bacterial vaginosis, in contrast to those who refrained from using this product. Furthermore, the occurrence of bacterial vaginosis was three times greater among women who applied antiseptic solutions to the vulva or within the vagina. Additionally, the frequency of bacterial vaginosis was six times higher in women utilizing a douching agent. When it comes to bacterial vaginosis, African American women are 2.9 times more likely to be diagnosed with bacterial vaginosis compared to women of European ancestry, possibly due to variations in their "normal" vaginal flora.

== Menstrual hygiene in adolescents ==
To observe the menstrual hygiene in adolescent girls, a cross-sectional study conducted in a secondary school in Singur West Bengal involved 160 girls. the findings were published in 2008 and revealed that a significant portion of respondents became aware of menstruation before menarche, with mothers being the primary source of information. While the majority recognized menstruation as a physiological process, knowledge and usage of sanitary pads were limited. Most girls employed soap and water for cleaning purposes, and a considerable percentage observed various restrictions during menstruation. Among the 160 respondents, 108 (67%) girls were aware of menstruation before experiencing menarche. Mothers were the primary source of information for 60 (37.5%) girls. A majority, 138 (86%), considered menstruation a physiological process. Only 78 (48%) girls were familiar with the use of sanitary pads during menstruation. In terms of practices, merely 18 (11.25%) girls used sanitary pads during menstruation. For cleaning purposes, 156 (97%) girls utilized both soap and water. Regarding restrictions, 136 (85%) girls adhered to various restrictions during menstruation.

== Society and culture ==
According to the World Health Organization, as of 2018 there are about 1.9 billion women who are of reproductive age. In low-income countries, women's choices of menstrual hygiene materials are often limited by the costs, availability and social norms. Not only are women's choices limited but, according to the WHO and UNICEF, 780 million people do not have access to improved water sources and about 2.5 billion people lack access to improved sanitation. The lack of proper hygiene leads to a harder time for women to manage feminine hygiene.

=== Costs and tax ===
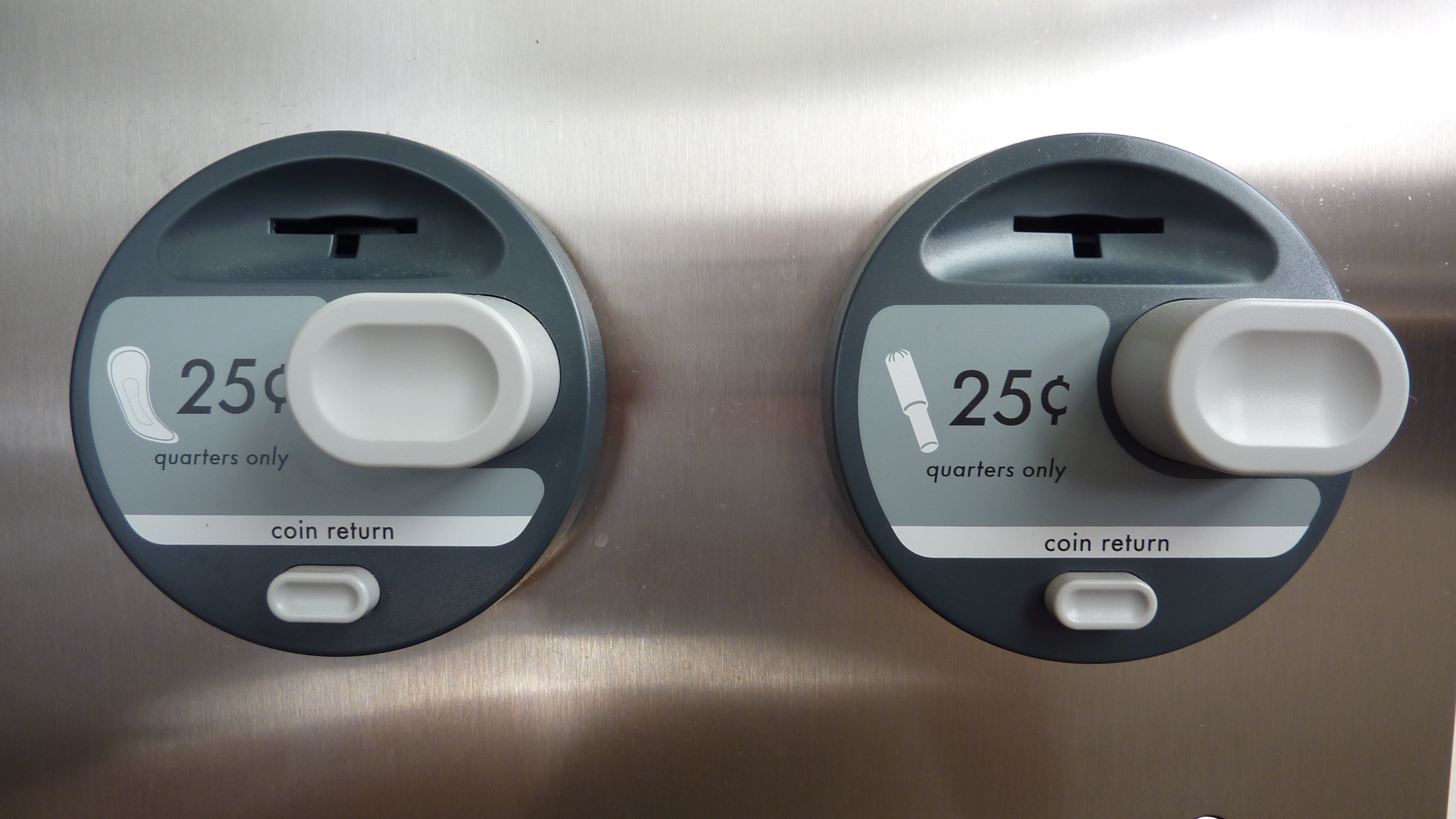
Menstrual hygiene product dispenser

Tampon tax is a shorthand for sales tax charged on tampons, pads, and menstrual cups. The cost of these commercial products for menstrual management is considered to be unacceptably high for many low-income women. At least half a million women across the world do not have enough money to adequately afford these products. This can result in missing days of school or even dropping out entirely in the worst cases. In some jurisdictions, similar necessities like medical devices and toilet paper are not taxed. Several initiatives worldwide advocate to eliminate the tax all together. In some countries, such petitions have already been successful (for example parts of the UK and the United States). The UK abolished the 5% minimum VAT imposed on sanitary products on 1 January 2021, as previously whilst a member of the European Union; EU law prohibited the UK or any EU member state from removing the 5% VAT imposed on sanitary products.

=== Access to products in prisons ===
The Federal Bureau of Prisons in the United States announced that women in its facilities would be guaranteed free menstrual pads and tampons. In section 411 of the First Step Act which was passed on May 22, 2018, states, "The Director of the Bureau of Prisons shall make the healthcare products described in subsection (c) available to prisoners for free, in a quantity that is appropriate to the healthcare needs of each prisoner".

=== Other social views ===
Some girls and women may view tampons and menstrual cups as affecting their virginity even though they have not engaged in sexual intercourse.

For those with autism, using pads before menstruation begins may help reduce sensory issues associated with menstrual hygiene products. Prior education and practice may help familiarize an individual with body changes and the process of using products associated with menstruation.

Menstruation may occur despite paralyzation; product use depends on the individual's personal preference.

== History ==
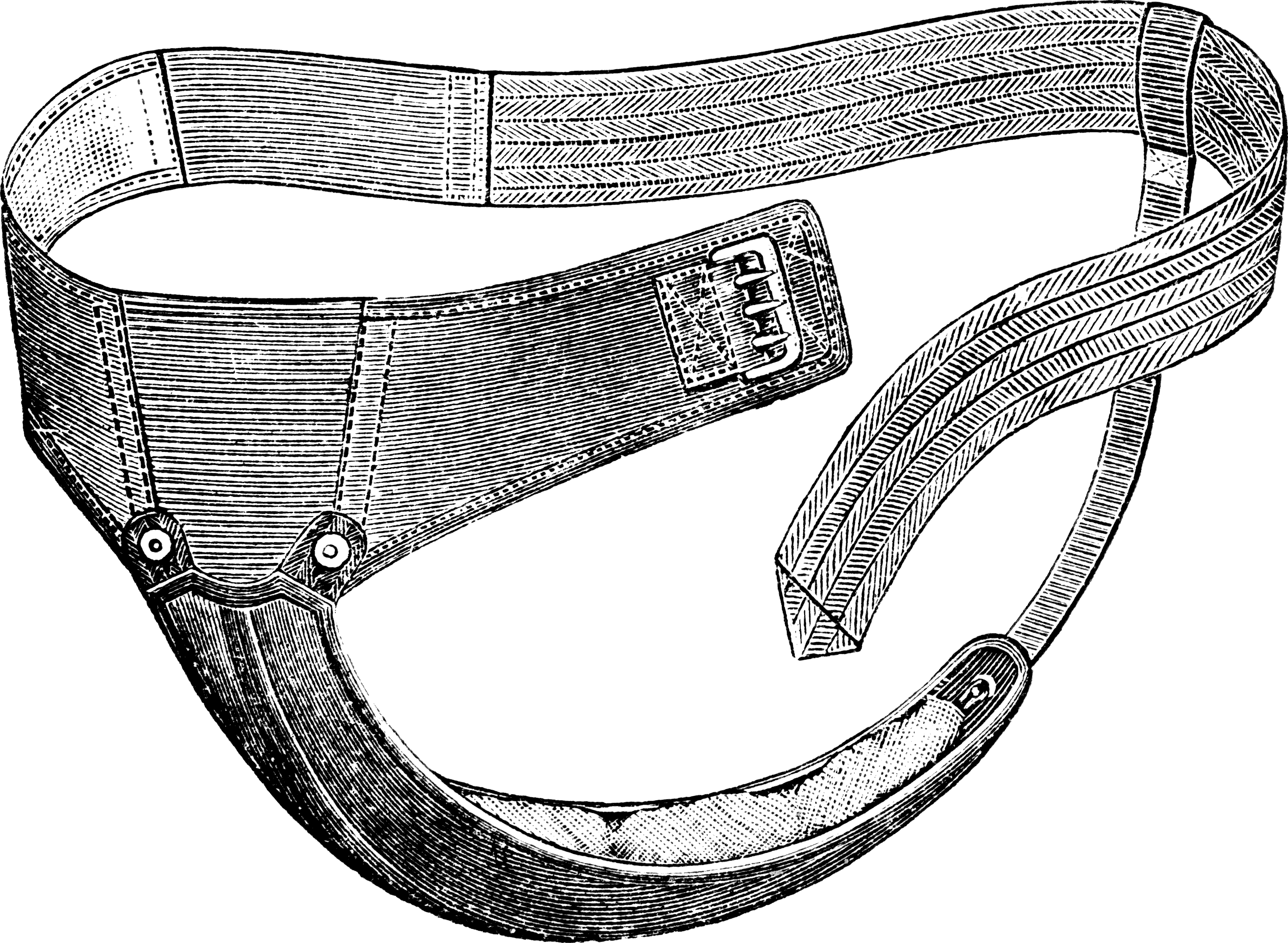
An early commercial menstrual product in the form of a menstrual belt. Illustration from 1911.

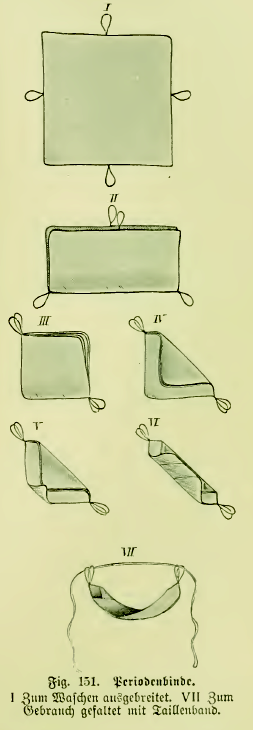
Instructions on how to fold a piece of fabric to be used as a menstrual pad. At the bottom, how to fasten the pad with cord to the waistband is demonstrated. From the German book The woman as a family doctor, 1911.

In ancient Egypt, the Roman Empire and Indonesia, various natural materials – wool, grass, papyrus – were used as tampons. In ancient Japan, the tampon was made of paper and held in place by a special binder called kama, and was changed up to 12 times a day.

In 18th-century Sweden, women in common society were not known to use feminine hygiene products and visible period stains on clothing did not attract much attention. A common expression for menstruation during this period was to "wear the clothes" or "wear the särk", a chemise-like undergarment.

It is likely that pieces of cloth or special rags were used to collect the menstrual fluid. However, there are few records of menstrual pads from the pre-industrial era. As artifacts, the various types of menstrual pads have not been preserved or survived in any particular sense, as the cloths used were discarded when they became worn out or the need for them ceased with menopause. However, as technology evolved, commercial hygiene products were introduced in the form of the menstrual pad, also known as the sanitary napkin. In Sweden, this happened at the end of the 19th century and has been linked to an increased focus on cleanliness, personal hygiene and health that occurred in the early part of the 20th century in the wake of urbanization. By the end of the 19th century, the first commercial sanitary napkin had also been introduced on the American market by Johnson & Johnson. It was a variant of the menstrual pad made of flannel.

Advertisements and product information for sanitary pads are the primary source of knowledge about the history of sanitary pads.

=== Early 20th-century commercial products ===
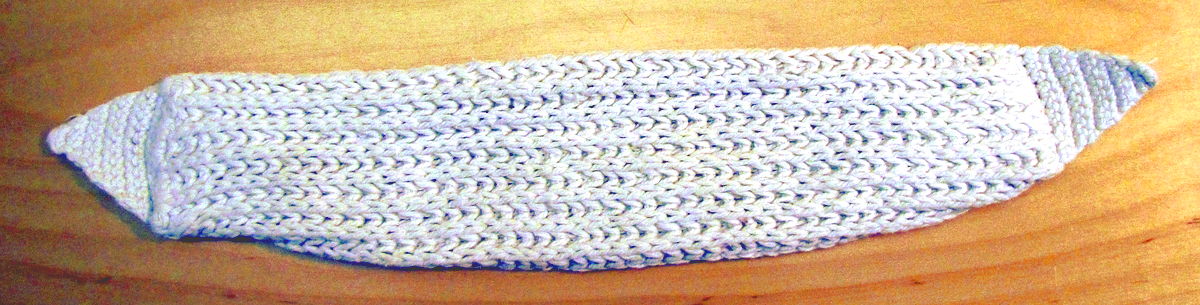
Homemade knitted menstrual pad

Sanitary napkins could be made of woven cotton, knitted or crocheted and filled with rags. They could be homemade for personal use or mass-produced and sold, such as in towns that had a textile industry.

The menstrual receptacle was the very earliest hygiene product to be launched as menstrual protection in Sweden, as early as 1879. It was made of rubber, like many of the hygiene articles of the time, and resembled a bowl-shaped casing that would sit on the outside of the abdomen. The menstrual receptacle is not considered to have gained much popularity.

The first half of the 20th century also saw the development of early intravaginal menstrual products similar to the menstrual cup, with an early patent dating from 1903.

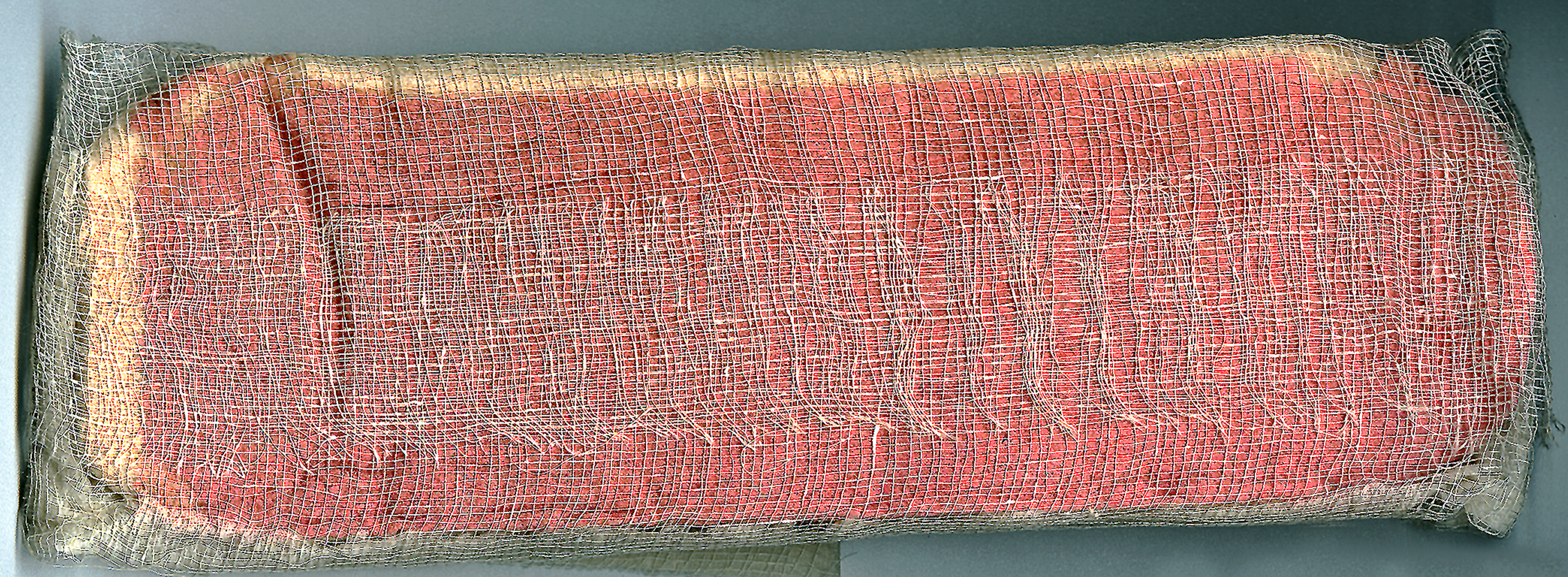
Camelia Populär brand sanitary napkin from military stocks for nurses, circa 1942

Menstrual belts were another form that menstrual protection took and began to appear in the late 19th century. They were made so that the pad itself was contained in a special holder that was fastened around the waist with a belt. The pads in these designs are referred to as "suction pads" in Swedish patent documents, such as the "Suction pad for menstruation" patent from 1889. The price for a menstrual belt could be between 2.75 – 3.50 SEK and pads had to be purchased for about 4–5 SEK each, depending on the size of the pack. From the price information available, menstrual protection was likely a costly purchase that was not available to everyone.

The sanitary belt can be seen as a modern version of the menstrual belt, but more like a girdle. The function of the belt is to hold the pad in place while giving the user greater freedom of motion. In Sweden, the product was introduced in the 1940s and was in use until the 1960s. In the 1970s, the adhesive strip on the underside of the pad was introduced, allowing it to be attached to the underwear and held in place without the use of a girdle, safety pin or belt.

=== Historical types of menstrual hygiene products ===
- Cup
- Pad
- Panty
- Sponges
- Nothing
- Sheep's wool
- Underwear
- Raw cotton
- Sanitary belt and napkin holder
- Crocheted sanitary napkins
- Clouts
- No belt
- Baby diapers
- Adult diapers
- Plants

== See also ==
- Menstrual hygiene management
