= Scheaffer Okore =

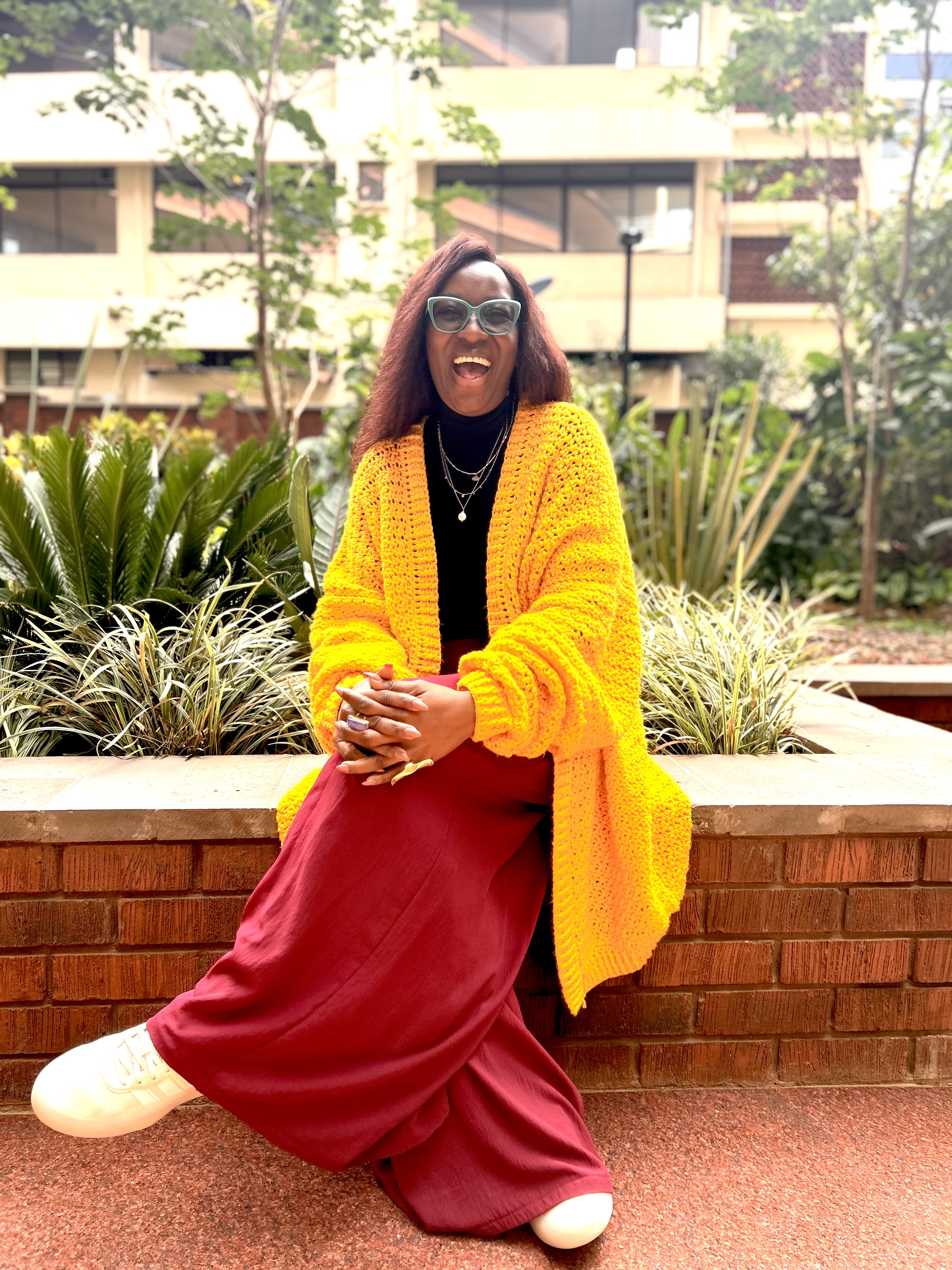
- Scheaffer Okore at DataFest Africa in Nairobi Kenya.
- Occupation: politician
- Known for: Political activism

Scheaffer Okore is a feminist politician and global development strategy advisor in governance, leadership, democratic processes and sexual reproductive health rights. She is the vice-chairperson of Ukweli Party and former head of programs for civic engagement at Siasa place. She holds a bachelor's degree in International Relations and Diplomacy from the University of Nairobi.

Scheaffer is an activist in Kenya who has been vocal about social justice, human rights, feminism, and gender-based violence.

In 2018. Okore was considered by Africa Youth Awards as one of top one hundred most prominent youth in the field of law.
