= Feminine wipe =

Cleansing cloths marketed to clean the vulvar area

Feminine wipes are feminine hygiene products marketed to clean the vulvar area and for odor control. As with other feminine hygiene products they are typically used by younger women and women of color. The use of these products has increased over time and the market for feminine wipe product globally is projected to be worth over $2 billion by 2027.
