= Bella (brand) =

Brand of feminine hygiene products

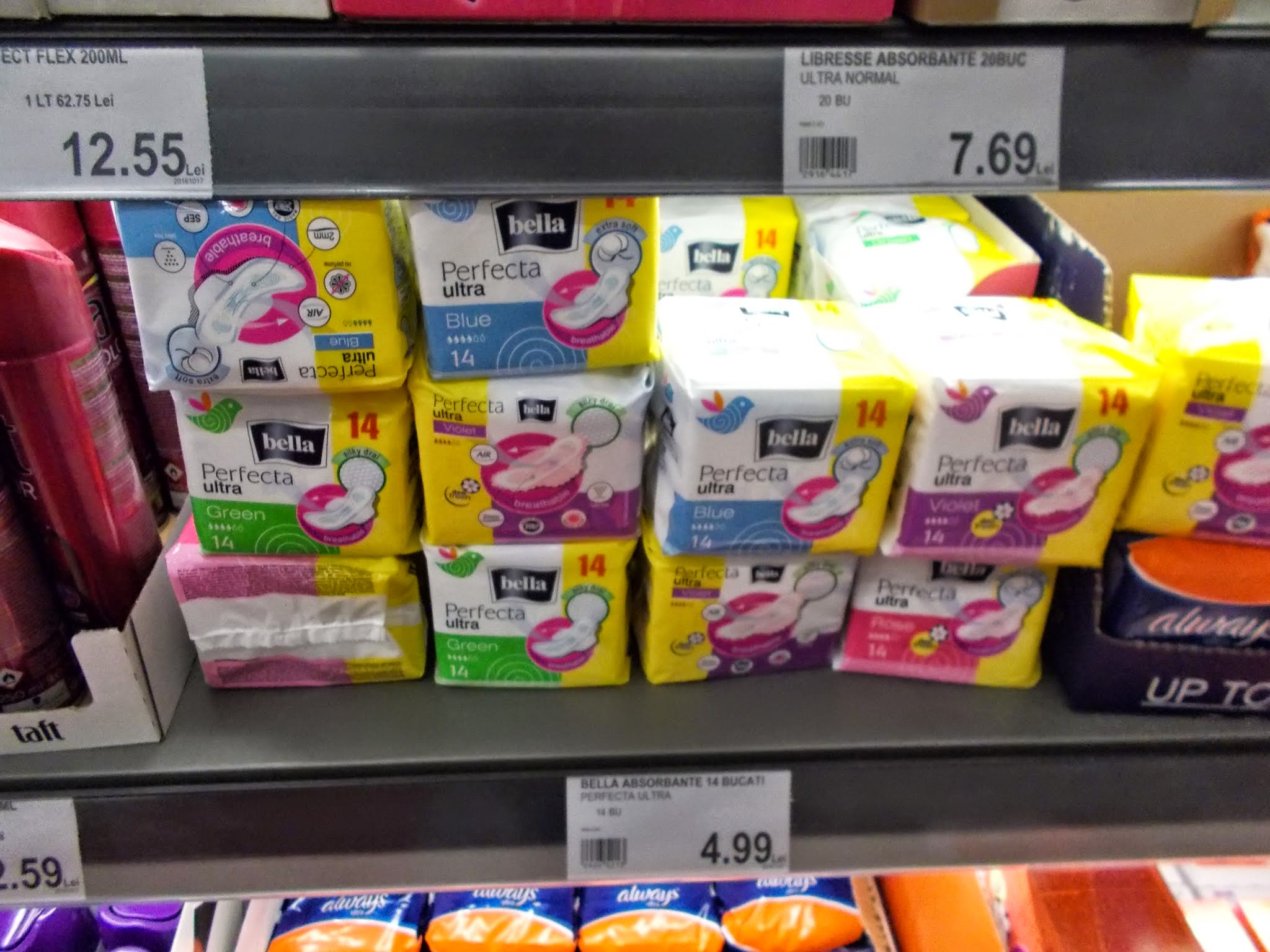
- Bella Perfecta maxipads
- Product type: Feminine hygiene line, including: Maxi pads Pantiliners; Cleansing wipes
- Current owner: TZMO SA
- Country: Poland
- Introduced: 1976
- Markets: Worldwide
- Tagline: Charm the world
- Website: bella-global.com/en_GLO

Bella is a brand of feminine hygiene products, including maxi pads, ultra thin pads, and female wipes. Bella is currently owned by Polish company Toruńskie Zakłady Materiałów Opatrunkowych (TZMO SA).

== Background ==
Bella is a brand of hygienic products for women – the market leader in Central and Eastern Europe, rapidly conquering the markets of Western Europe and Asia. Under the sign of Bella sold a wide range of products: sanitary napkins, panty liners, tampons and other feminine hygiene products. The range of hygiene products for women was founded in 1976, when in Toruń Plant Materials Opatrunkowych began production of sanitary napkins called Donna. From those distant days, the quality of products continues to grow. There was also a modification of the name – Donna pads were marked with the name Bella Donna, which in Italian means "beautiful woman" and introduced the name Bella.

== Products ==
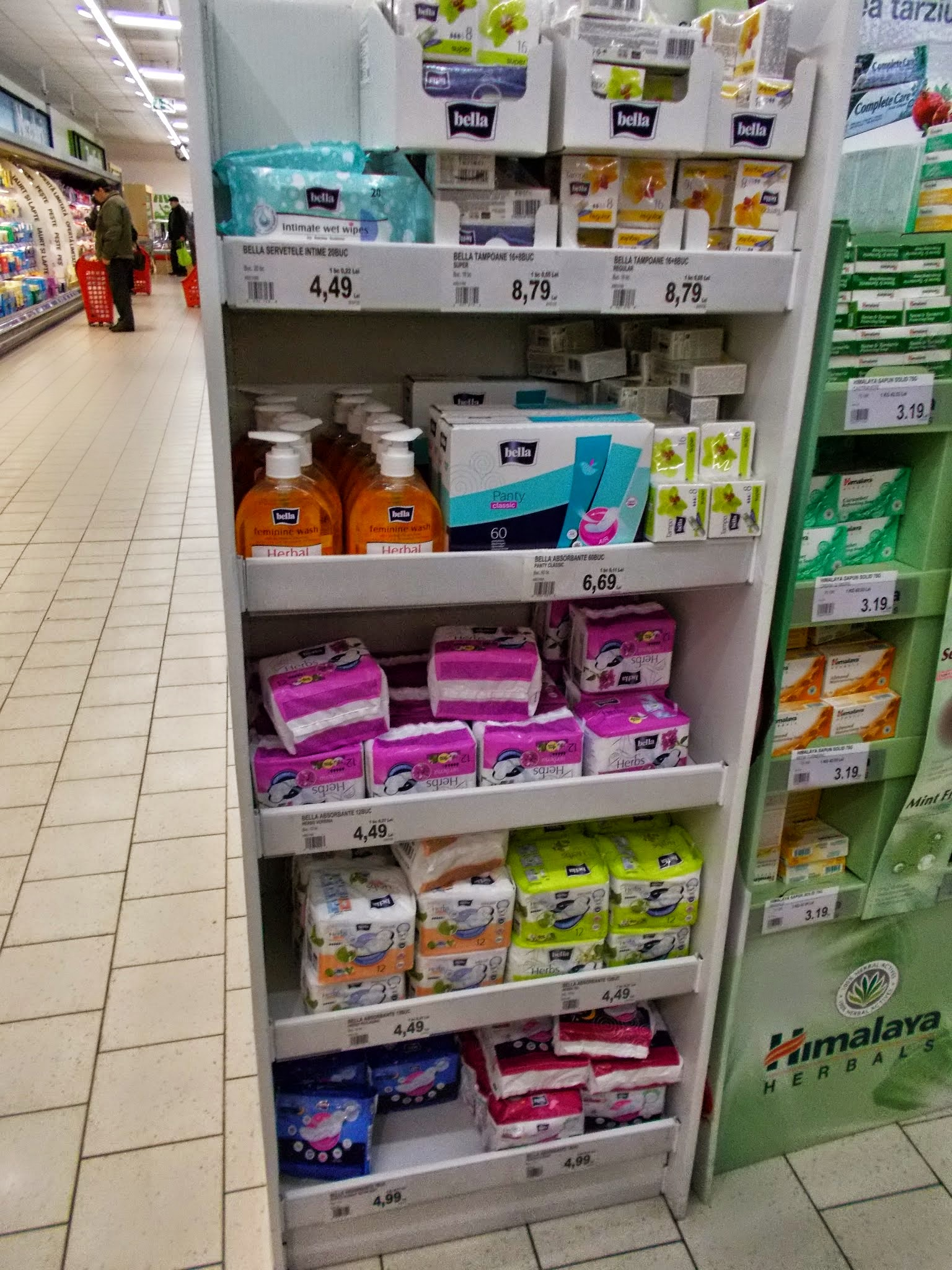
Various Bella products

- Bella – traditional sanitary pads
- Bella Perfecta – ultrathin sanitary pads
- Bella for Teens – sanitary pads, pantyliners and tampons for teenagers
- Bella Herbs – traditional maxi pads with different plant extracts (tilia, verbena, plantago)
- Bella Panty – pantyliners
- Bella Tampo – tampons
- Bella Control – incontinence products for women

== Gallery ==
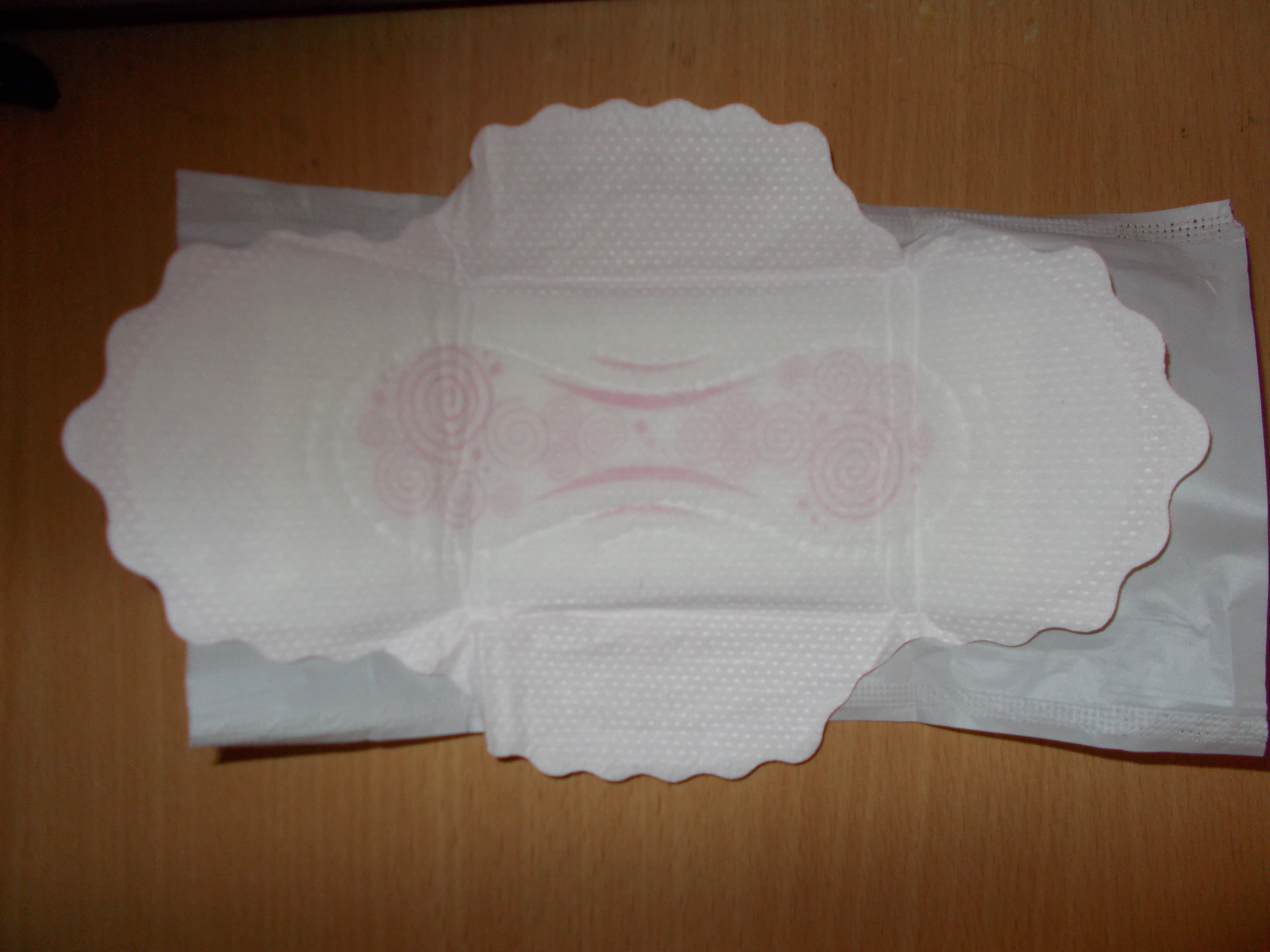
Bella maxi pad

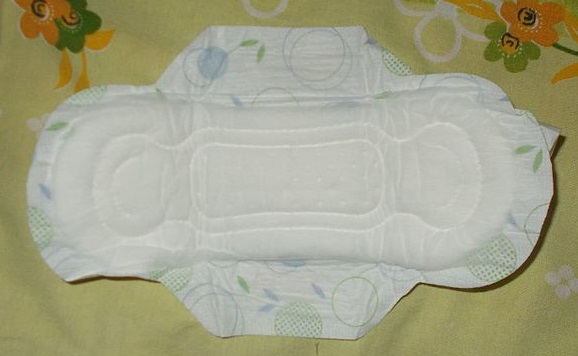
Bella Herbs Maxipad

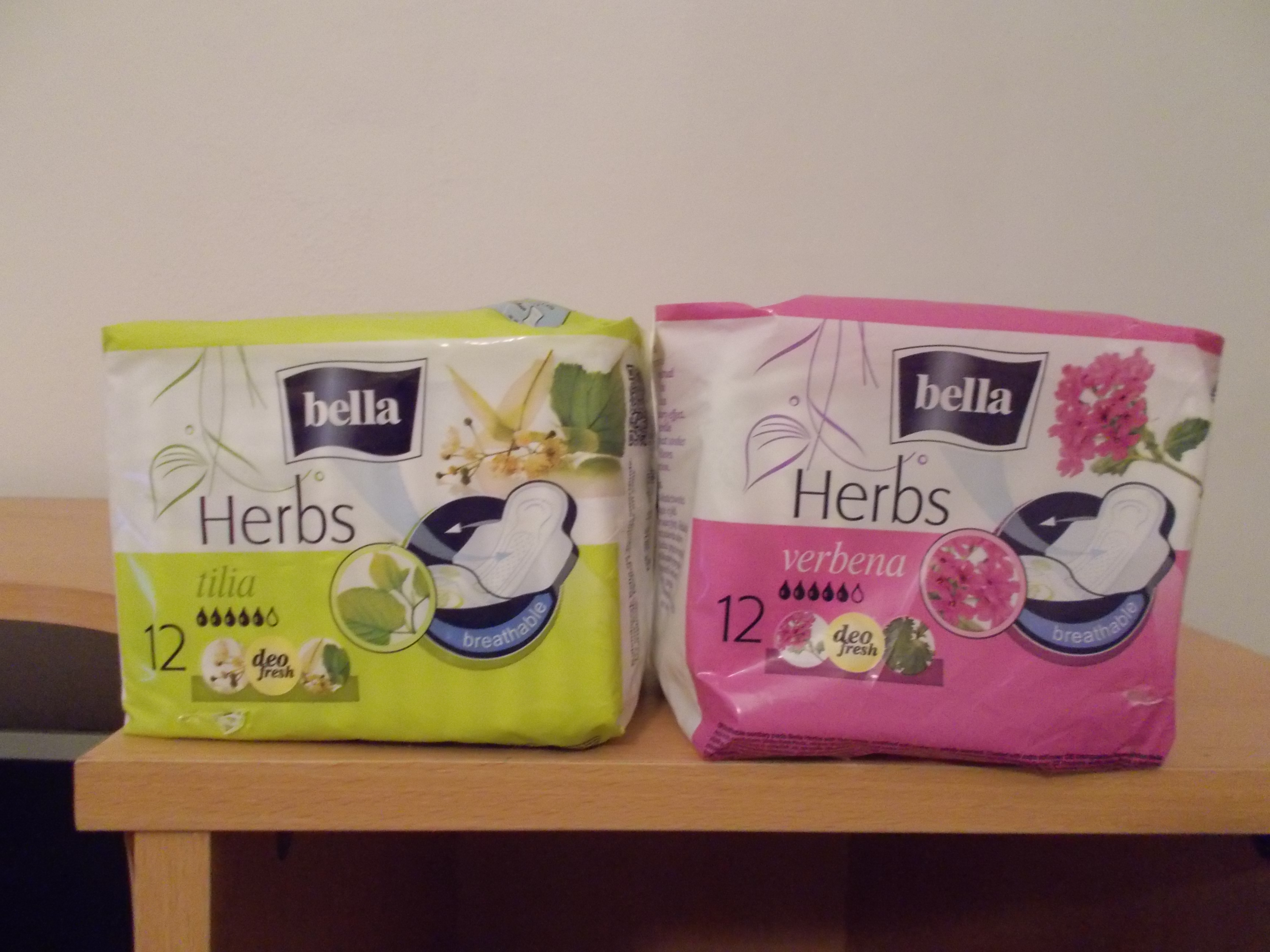
Bella Herbs

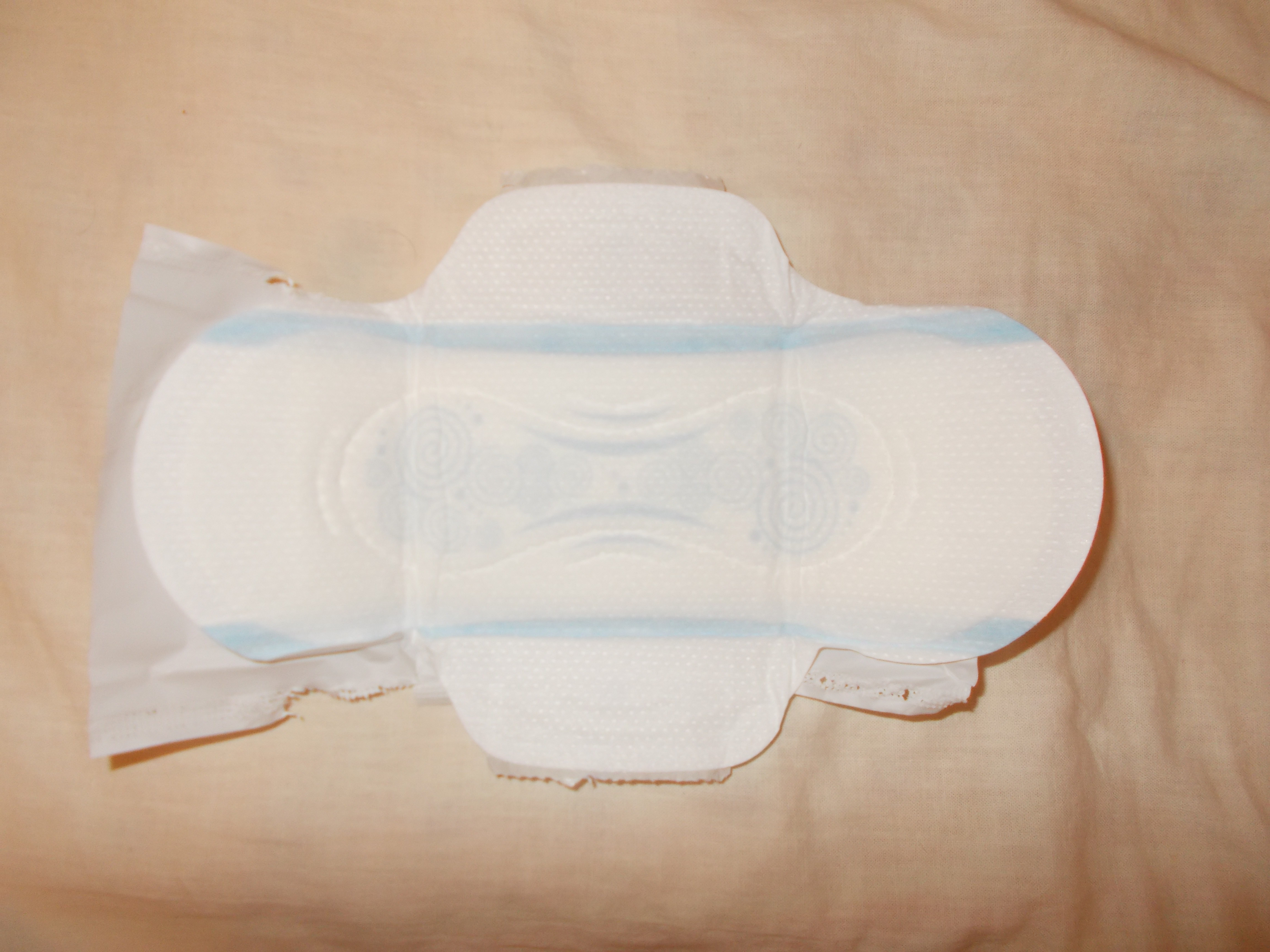

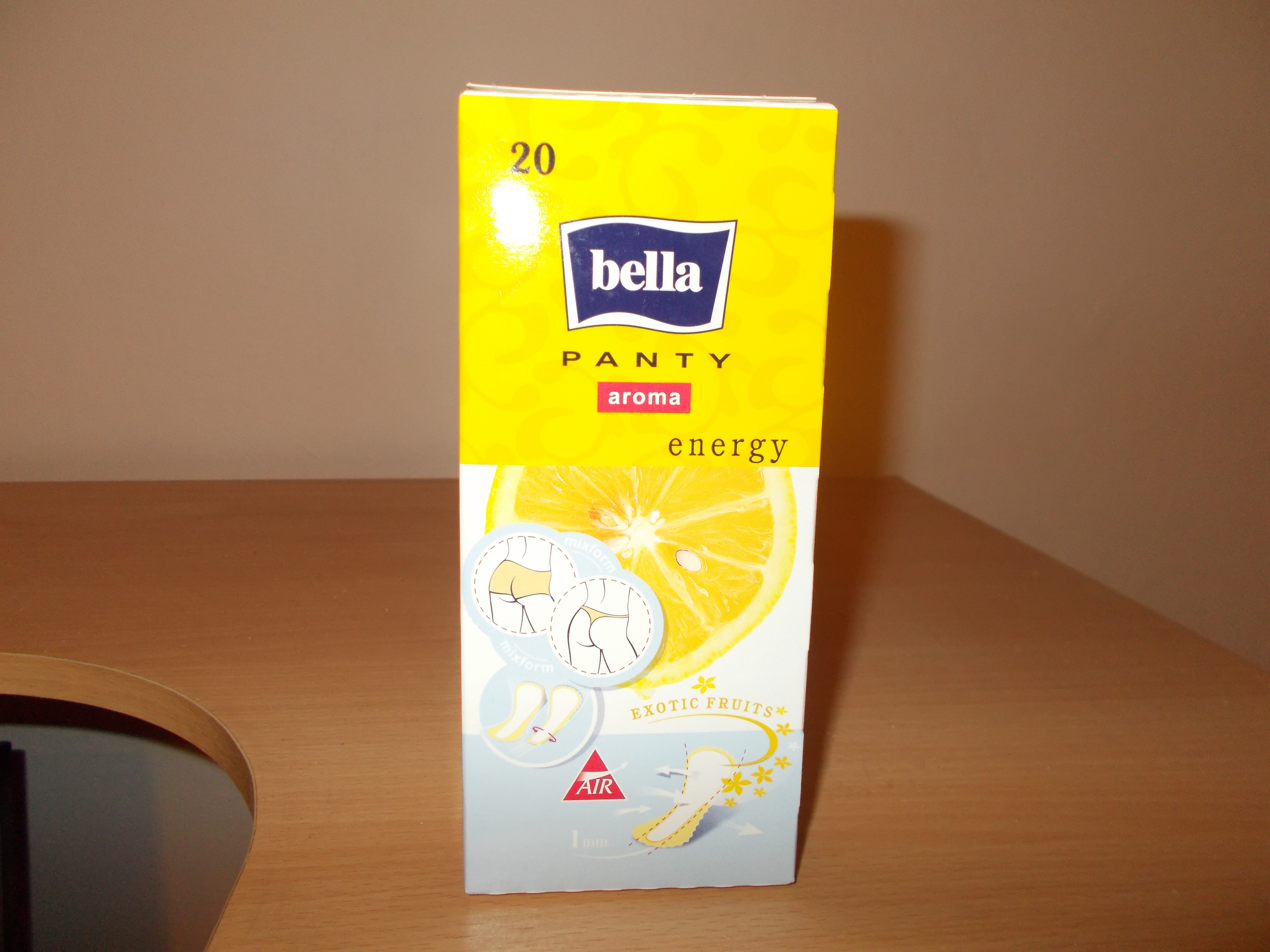
Bella pantyliners

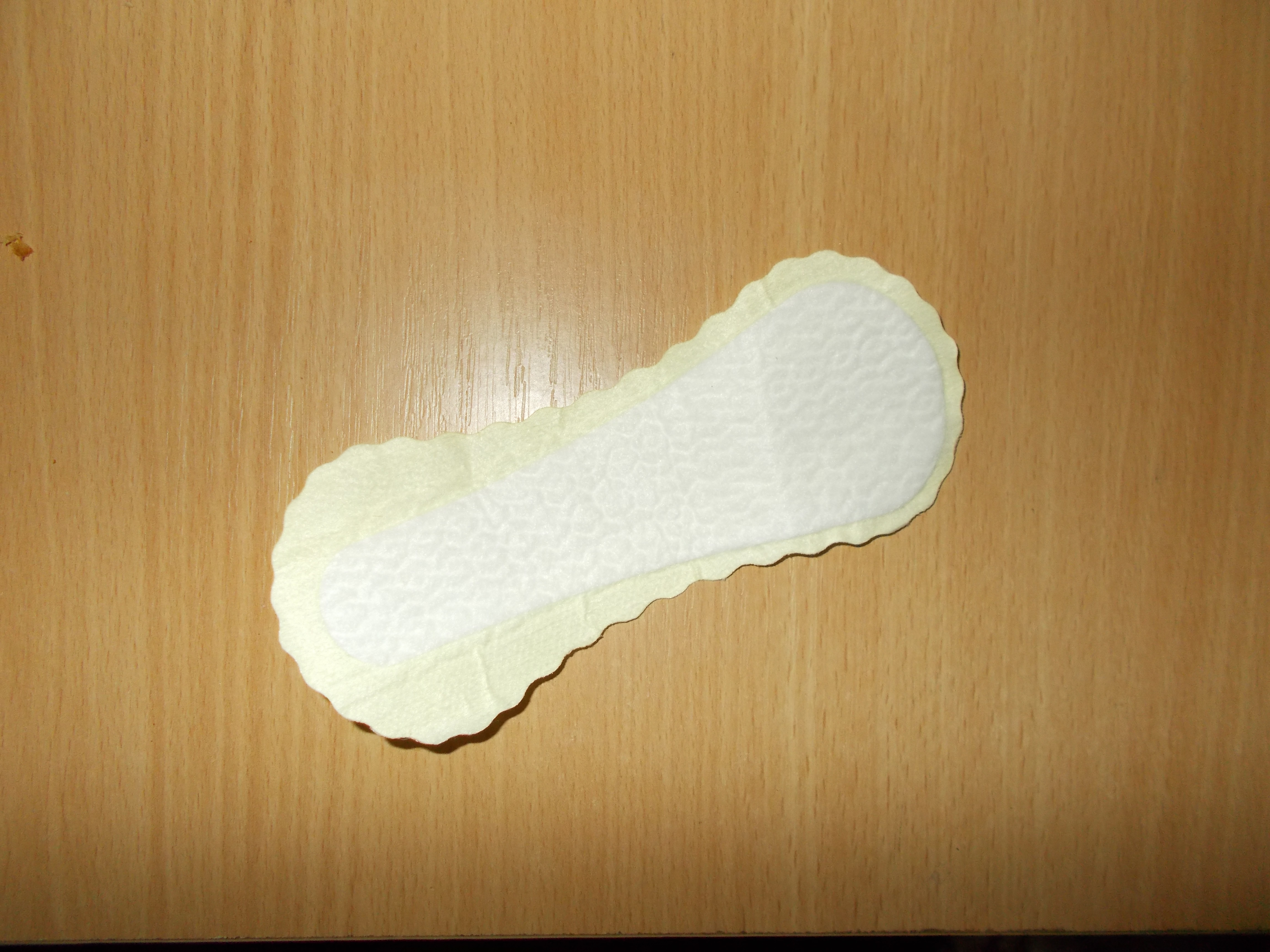
Bella pantyliners

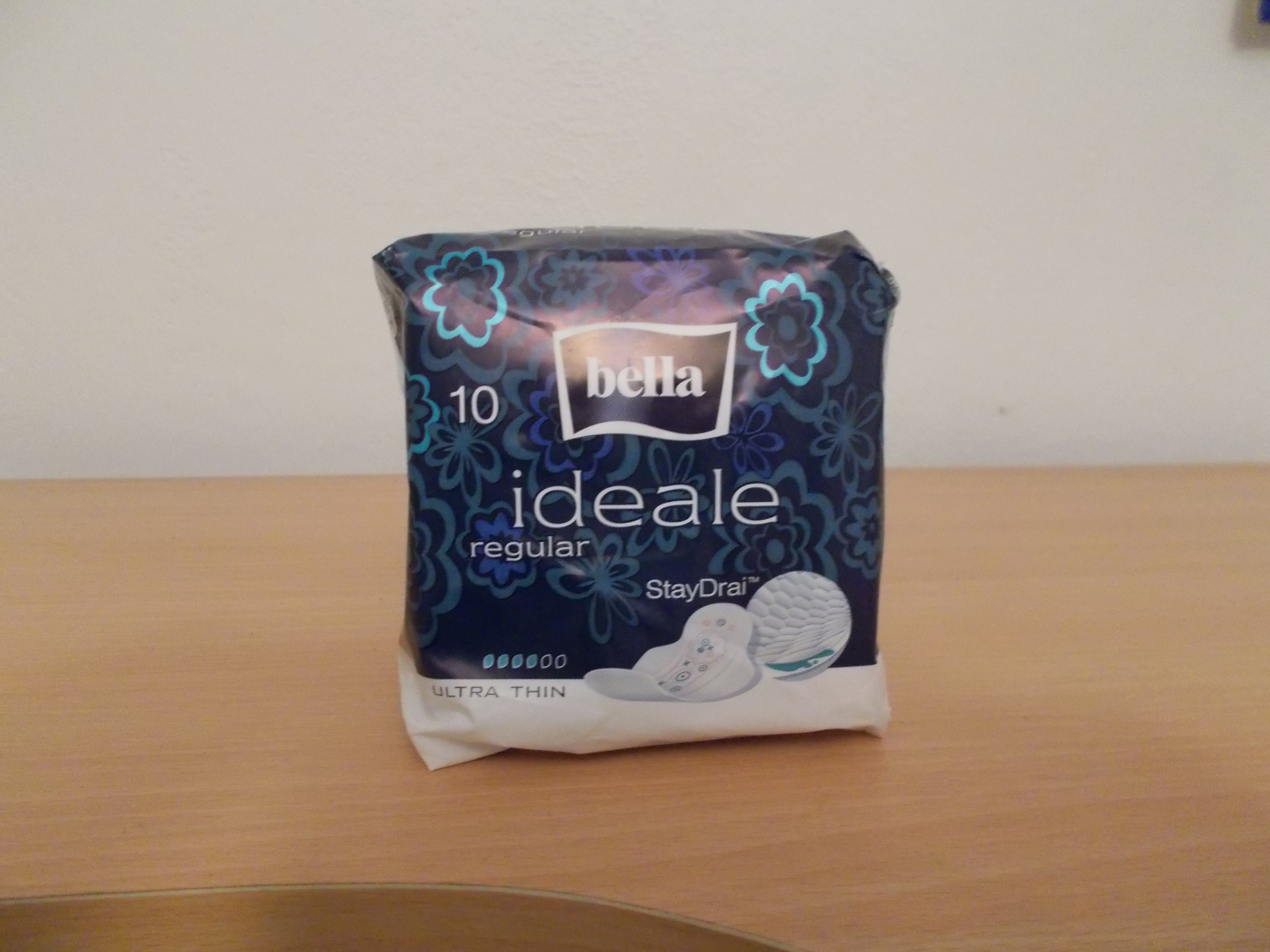

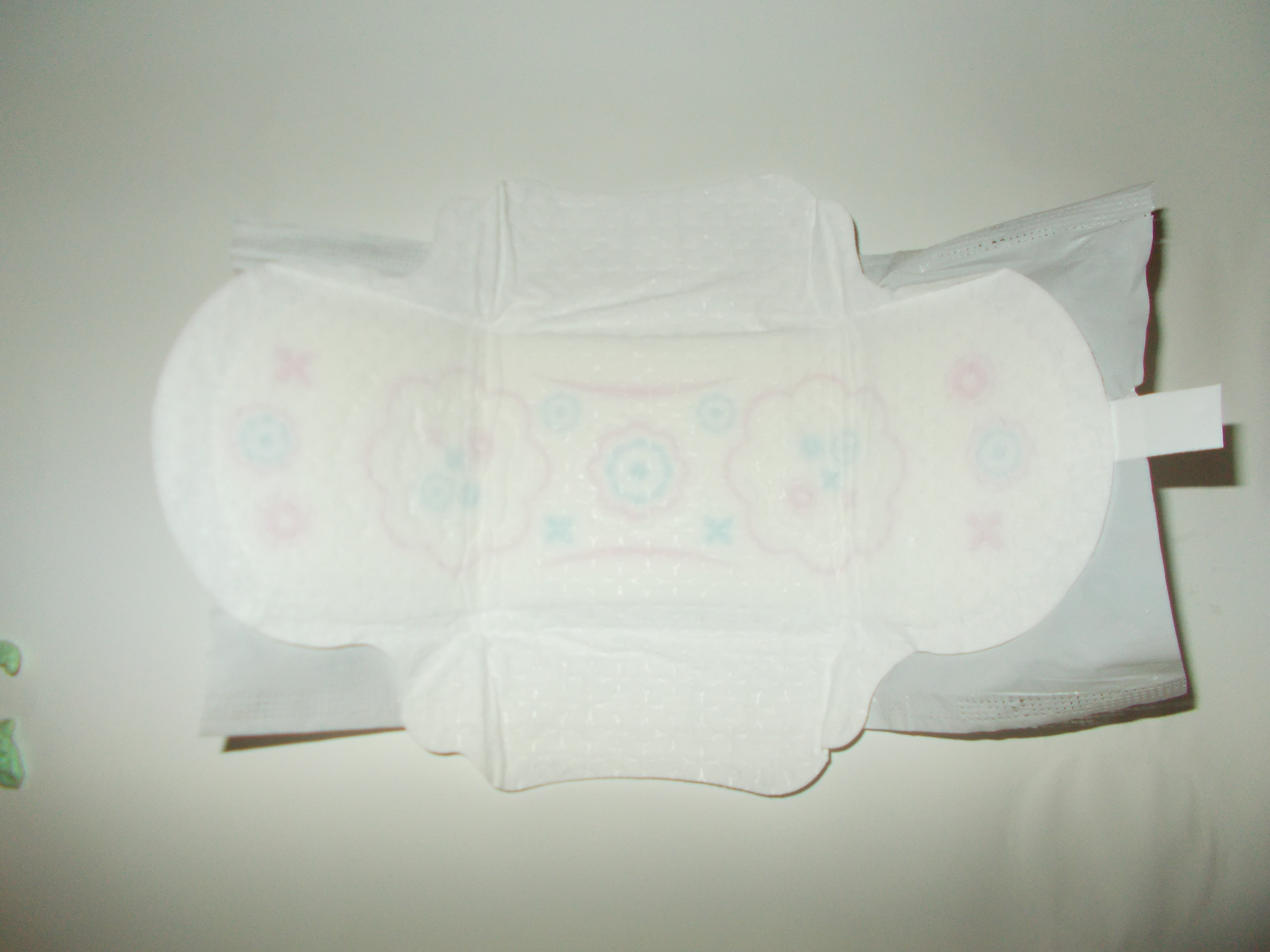

== See also ==
- Aisle (company)
- Hengan International
- Libresse
- Lil-lets
- O.b. (brand)
- Thinx
