= O.b. (brand) =

Tampon brand

o.b.
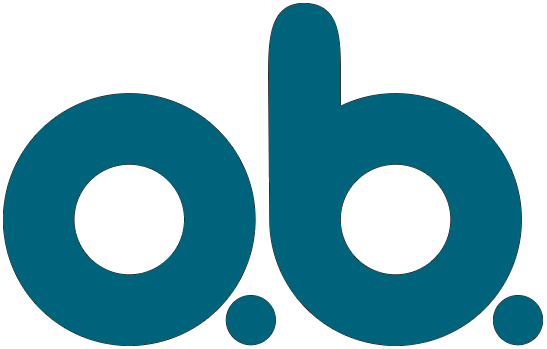
- Product type: Tampon
- Current owner: Kenvue; Edgewell (U.S. only)
- Country: United States
- Introduced: March 1950; 76 years ago
- Markets: Worldwide
- Previous owners: Johnson & Johnson (1974–2013); Hahn GmbH (1950–1974)
- Website: ob-tampons.com

o.b. is a brand of tampon, originally developed in Germany in 1950 and manufactured by Carl Hahn GmbH. It is now owned by Kenvue outside of the United States and Edgewell in the US. The product was named by the gynecologist Judith Esser-Mittag who also developed it. The initials o.b. are an abbreviation of the German phrase ohne Binde ('without napkin').

== History ==
The idea for a tampon which could be inserted without a separate applicator was initiated in 1947 by the German auto engineer Carl Hahn and the lawyer Heinz Mittag. They wanted to introduce tampons to the German market, but the cardboard used for the applicator in the American tampon product Tampax, which at the time dominated the market, was unavailable in post-war Germany. Hahn and Mittag approached Karl Julius Anselmino, director of the Landesfrauenklinik women's hospital in Wuppertal for advice on its design and development. He told them that the job required a woman and recommended the young gynecologist Judith Esser.

Esser's finished design went into production in Wuppertal in March 1950. By 2010 the Wuppertal plant had become the largest tampon factory in the world and was exporting to over 30 countries.

In 1974 Johnson & Johnson took over Hahn's company and two years later introduced o.b. tampons to the American market with an $8 million advertising campaign on television and radio. Esser herself appeared in some of the later American television commercials. Johnson & Johnson introduced o.b. tampons in China in 1993, and as of 2016 they were still the only brand of tampon sold in Chinese stores.

In 2013 the o.b. brand in the United States was acquired from Johnson & Johnson by Edgewell Personal Care. Kenvue (the former subsidiary of Johnson & Johnson Consumer Health) remains the brand owner internationally.

== Product line ==
- O.B. ProComfort
- O.B. ProComfort Night
- O.B. Original
- O.B. Compact Applicator

== See also ==
- Aisle (company)
- Bella (brand)
- Feminine hygiene
- Hengan International
- Libresse
- Lil-lets
- Thinx
