= GladRags =

Brand of feminine hygiene products

- Type: Benefit corporation
- Industry: Feminine hygiene
- Founded: 1993; 33 years ago
- Founders: Brenda Mallory; Karen Paule
- Headquarters: Portland, Oregon, United States
- Products: Cloth menstrual pads menstrual cups
- Website: gladrags.com

GladRags is a feminine hygiene company based in Portland, Oregon that produces reusable cloth menstrual pads and menstrual cups.

GladRags focuses on sustainability and reusability. The company's cloth pads are machine-washable and made from soft cotton flannel that folds and snaps around underwear. Each cloth pad includes two inserts and a holder and comes in various patterns and colors. They are made to last at least five years and are sometimes used in conjunction with menstrual cups. The company also sells the XO Flo reusable silicone menstrual cup and was formerly the primary distributor of the Moon Cup brand.

GladRags is owned and operated by women. It was founded in 1993 by Brenda Mallory and Karen Paule. Mallory was inspired by reusable cloth diapers. Tracy Puhl has led the company since 2011. In 2013 Puhl was named Young Entrepreneur of the Year for Oregon and Southwest Washington by the U.S. Small Business Administration. It is cruelty-free and was first certified as a B corporation in 2012. GladRags partners with a women-owned sewing company and other organizations.

Typical annual expenditures on disposable menstrual products were US$60 (equivalent to $115.96 in 2025) in 1999; GladRags and Natracare are among the reusable brands recommended for cost-conscious consumers. Products like GladRags, menstrual cups, and natural sea-sponge tampons are all marketed to self-described "conscientious" female consumers. Followers of the zero waste movement may use reusable-pad brands like GladRags, potentially in combination with reusable period underwear, reusable period cups or discs, and/or compostable sponge tampons. They may be used to collect menstrual blood for use as plant fertilizer.

== See also ==
- Thinx
