= Wenbo =

Wenbo is a given name, usually pronounced as wén bó (文博、文伯）. Notable people with the name include:

- Li Wenbo (born 1983), Chinese footballer
- Liang Wenbo (born 1987), Chinese snooker player
- Shi Wenbo (born 1950), Chinese businessman
- Wang Wenbo (born 1969), Chinese Paralympic athlete
- Wei Wenbo (1905–1987), Chinese politician
- Zang Wenbo (born 1996), Chinese figure skater
