= Aisle (disambiguation) =

An aisle is a space for walking with rows of seats on both sides or with rows of seats on one side and a wall on the other.

Aisle may also refer to:

- Aisle (company), a Canadian manufacturer of reusable menstrual products
- Aisle (political term), the divide between two political parties
- Aisle (video game), an interactive fiction game released in 1999
- "The Aisle", a song by PinkPantheress from Heaven Knows, 2023
