= Mary Kalsrap =

- Born: Mary Kalsrap; Vanuatu
- Occupation: social entrepreneur

Mary Kalsrap is an entrepreneur from Vanuatu. She co-founded and runs a social enterprise making re-usable sanitary pads for women and girls.

== Life ==
In 2016 Kalsrap and five other women received funding from Lav Kokonas, a business based in New Zealand, to start their social enterprise, named Mamma’s Laef. The women gather at Kalsrap's home in Pango, Port Vila, and sew and package re-usable sanitary pads for sale and distribution in the community. The group also runs sessions in schools to teach girls about puberty and the reproductive system.

In 2018 Kalsrap won a grant from the government of Australia to expand the organisation.
