= Glad Rags (disambiguation) =

Glad Rags (foaled 1963) was an Irish Thoroughbred racehorse.

Glad Rags or Gladrags may also refer to:

- Glad Rags (1922 film) directed by Hugh Fay
- Glad Rags (TV series), an Australian children's series
- "Glad Rags", a song by Tennessee Ernie Ford, 1958
- "Glad Rags", a song by Mike Badger and The Onset from The Pool of Life, 1988
- Gladrags, an Indian magazine for women
- GladRags, a brand of cloth menstrual pads
