= Incontinence underwear =

Washable, absorbent undergarments for managing urinary incontinence

Incontinence underwear (or convenience underwear) is a type of reusable undergarment designed to absorb urine. It provides an alternative to disposable incontinence products, which are often bulky and plastic-based. Due to concerns about the environmental impact of disposable products, incontinence underwear is becoming an alternative to sanitary pads. Only recently has textile technology existed to enable the design and manufacture of reusable products with comparable functionality to a disposable pad or diaper.

== Incontinence ==
It is estimated that 1 in 4 women over the age of 35 experience some level of urinary incontinence, often following childbirth or during menopause. Incontinence is experienced by approximately 1 in 10 men, commonly related to prostate issues. Incontinence increases with age, most commonly experienced by those 65 and over. Due to increased life expectancy and decreased fertility rates, the world is experiencing a "global greying", which has contributed to an increase in the global market for incontinence products as the proportion of people over 65 increases.

== Fabric incontinence underwear ==
Reusable underwear alternatives to pads and diapers may feature built-in absorbent pads or insertable disposable pads, but some products offer options, more closely matching traditional underwear. Highly absorbent fabrics combine moisture-trapping fabric layers to absorb as much as traditional products. These products can be washed and reused. This offers economic and environmental benefits. The use of fabric textiles in these products also means that it is now possible to make incontinence underwear that respects users' desired appearance.

Incontinence underwear products are generally designed to cater for light bladder leakage (LBL), and as such are less appropriate for other uses addressed by high absorbency pads and diapers.

Although reusable period underwear is similar in concept and also absorbent, it is not generally interchangeable with incontinence underwear due to differences in volume and speed of flow between menstrual blood and urine.

Some manufacturers of disposable products are introducing disposable incontinence underwear that gives the appearance of traditional fabric underwear, such as TENA and Depend. These manufacturers imitate how normal underwear sits on the body, to make the underwear more discreet and comfortable.

Severe urinary incontinence typically still requires single-use disposable pads.

== Market growth ==
The US incontinence market was forecast to reach US$1.6 billion by 2017, driven by an aging population and a gradual breakdown of the taboo surrounding incontinence. These factors will contribute to increased demand for incontinence products. The global market is expected to grow by between 4 and 7% per annum.

Incontinence underwear manufacturers include Australian-based Night N Day Comfort, Canadian-based Caretex, the UK's Capatex Care (which make the ‘Kylie’ range), and the US-based Wearever. Companies that make incontinence pads include Kimberly-Clark (Depend and Poise brands), Sweden's SCA (TENA brand), First Quality (Prevail brand) and Domtar (Attends brand).

Night N Day Comfort modifies Australian underwear brand BONDS underwear by adding an incontinence pad. Icon Underwear and Confitex, in 2015 showed a collection of high-end, pad-free incontinence lingerie on the runway at New Zealand Fashion Week.

== See also ==
- Adult diaper
- Incontinence pad
