= Lil-lets =

Menstrual product company

- Product type: Feminine hygiene
- Current owner: Premier FMCG
- Country: United Kingdom
- Markets: UK, Ireland, South Africa
- Previous owners: Southalls, Smith & Nephew, Accantia, Electra Private Equity
- Website: http://www.lil-lets.com/

Lil-lets is a brand providing feminine hygiene products that operates principally in the UK, Ireland and South Africa. Since 2000, the company has restructured through two management buyouts (MBO) to become a business crossing all sectors of the feminine hygiene market, including tampons, sanitary napkins, pantyliners and intimate care. They also do programmes for schools that teach young girls the changes that occur when they begin to menstruate.

== History ==
The company was founded in 1954 and launched by Southalls of Birmingham. They were based on a design created with Dr. Judith Esser-Mittag, a female gynaecologist and expand widthways for improved comfort and better protection. Initially two absorbencies were available, Regular and Super, for differing menstrual flows.

In 1958, Southalls was acquired by Smith & Nephew (S&N) and incorporated into their Sanitary Protection Division, alongside Arthur Berton Ltd, another S&N acquisition. These acquisitions positioned S&N as the UK market leaders in sanitary towels, with the Dr. White's and Lilia brands second with Lil-lets.

In 1994, Lil-lets applicator tampons were launched.

In 2000, a management buyout (MBO) by Accantia (now Simple) took ownership of the Lil-lets brand.

In 2001, Lil-lets launched the Super plus Extra, a high absorbency product (classified as 5 droplets by AHPMA, compared to Regular at 2 droplets, Super at 3 and Super Plus at 4). This was a UK first, offering consumers with a heavy flow a specialist product.

In 2002, Lil-lets launch "Mixed Packs", with a range of absorbencies in each pack, allowing consumers to buy one pack in order to use a different absorbency for the differing flow rates within a period (often lighter at the start and finish of the period). Solutions, a range of intimate care products is also launched, featuring wipes, a cleansing mousse and a heat soother patch to warm the tummy to help with period pain.

In 2005, Lil-lets launched pantyliners.

20 December 2006, Lil-lets was sold to Electra Private Equity, and the Lil-lets Group of companies was formed, creating a standalone Feminine Hygiene business.

In 2007, Lil-lets launched a range of Sanitary Pads, making Lil-lets the only brand to cross all sectors of the feminine hygiene market – tampons, pads, pantyliners and intimate care.

In 2008, Lil-lets launched a compact applicator range in direct competition to the market leader Tampax, followed in 2009 by a video advertising campaign that showed the key difference between the two brands. Lil-lets tampons expand widthways, with Tampax tampons expanding along their length.

In 2012, Electra invested another £7 million equity.

In November 2013, Electra sold Lil-lets to Premier FMCG (Pty) Limited, a South African company.

=== List of products ===
- Non-applicator tampons
- Applicator tampons
- Sanitary napkins
- Pantyliners
- Specialist hygiene products
