= Xu Lianjie =

Chinese businessman (1953–2025)

- Born: 1953; China
- Died: 17 April 2025 (aged 72); China
- Known for: CEO, Hengan International

Xu Lianjie (Chinese: 許連捷; 1953 – 17 April 2025), also known as Hui Lin Chit, was a Chinese billionaire businessman who was the CEO of Hengan International.

== Life and career ==
Xu was born in China in 1953. In 1985, he co-founded Hengan International with Shi Wenbo, and they produce sanitary napkins and baby diapers.

He held the title of senior economist in the People's Republic of China and was the chairman of a number of trade associations.

In October 2015, Forbes estimated his net worth to be US$2.6 billion.

Xu died on 17 April 2025, at the age of 72.
