= Miki Agrawal =

Canadian-born entrepreneur

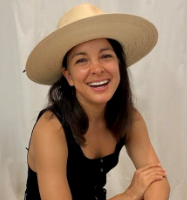
- Occupation: Businesswoman
- Known for: Tushy; Thinx

Miki Agrawal is a Canadian businesswoman from Montreal, Canada. She is a co-founder of Thinx, a female underwear company. She later founded bidet manufacturing company Tushy.

== History ==
Agrawal was born to a family of Indian and Japanese parents in Canada before migrating to the United States. She graduated at Cornell University and began working at Deutsche Bank's investment banking division in Liberty Street.

Agrawal is the owner of New York restaurant Wild, which has one unit in Williamsburg and another in West Village. Wild received an initial fund of $250,000 from investors.

=== Thinx ===
Agrawal co-founded Thinx, a New York company that produces "underwear for women with periods", along with her friend Antonia Saint Dunbar and sister Radha Agrawal. In 2016, they released a new line for trans men, along with a new tagline "for people with periods”. She left the company in March 2017 amid accusations of misconduct. The complaint stated that she had touched an employee's breast. Agrawal denied the allegations and the case was dismissed by the NY Human Rights Commission.

During her management of the company, she launched an infamous advertisement campaign in New York City subways, using depictions of grapefruit and eggs in order to represent menstruation. The campaign was ultimately approved by the Metropolitan Transportation Authority.

=== Tushy ===
Agrawal founded Tushy in 2018. TUSHY offers a line of attachable bidets designed to improve hygiene and reduce toilet paper consumption. In 2019, the company organized the "Butt-Con" convention.
