= Days for Girls =

Nonprofit organization

Days for Girls (DfG) is a nonprofit organization that prepares and distributes sustainable menstrual health solutions to girls who would otherwise miss school during their monthly periods. DfG was founded in 2008 by American Celeste Mergens. After visiting an orphanage in Nairobi, Kenya, she discovered that menstruating girls stayed in their dormitories for days, sitting on cardboard to absorb their flow, because they could not afford feminine hygiene products. Her first response was to organize donations of disposable sanitary pads, but she realized that this was not a sustainable solution as the girls had no way to dispose of used pads. She then developed the idea of creating washable, reusable pads and providing the girls with a personal kit of all they would need to continue their schooling with hygiene and dignity. By 2018, the DfG Kits (designed to last up to three years) and health education programs had reached more than one million girls and women in over 100 countries.

DfG Kits are made by volunteers who work as "teams", some of which go on to acquire the status of "chapters". Student volunteers operate as "clubs". These groups have formed in many countries, including Australia, Canada, New Zealand, the United Kingdom, and the United States. Each kit is in a draw-string bag and includes reusable cloth menstrual pads made up of colorful shields and liners, panties, a washcloth and soap, a carry pouch for washing & storing, and other items. The kit enables girls to carry their clean and used pads discreetly and to take care of their own hygiene needs. During the distributions, communities also receive health education to break stigmas and cultural taboos associated with menstruation.

In 2012, Days for Girls International launched an Enterprise Program to help local women establish social enterprises to make and distribute kits in their own countries. Close to 70 Days for Girls Enterprises now exist in more than a dozen countries across Africa, Asia, and Latin America. In select regions and in order to improve sustainability, DfG kits also come with menstrual cups, which have a longer use life than washable cloth pads.

Days for Girls International is headquartered in Mount Vernon, Washington, United States, and has offices in Ghana, Guatemala, Nepal, and Uganda. The organization's impact and transparency have earned high ratings from GuideStar. Celeste Mergens, the organization's founder and CEO, was awarded a Purpose Prize by AARP in 2017.

In 2019, Days for Girls was awarded $250,000 by Goldman Sachs, as the cause supported by the first-place winner in the Goldman Sachs Gives Analyst Impact Fund competition, where analysts from the firm compete to gain support for their chosen nonprofit.

In 2020, Public Interest Registry named Days for Girls International its .ORG of the Year, awarding the organization $45,000 to continue improving female health and education across the globe ($30,000 for .ORG of the Year and $15,000 for the Combatting Coronavirus Award).

Mergens announced her retirement from the organization in January 2022, and published a book, The Power of Days: A Story of Resilience, Dignity, and the Fight for Women's Equity in 2023. Tiffany Larson was named the new CEO in April 2022.
