= Premier FMCG =

South African food company

- Type: Public
- Traded as: JSE: PMR
- ISIN: ZAE000320321
- Industry: Food manufacturing
- Founded: 1824; 202 years ago
- Headquarters: Midrand, Gauteng, South Africa
- Area served: Worldwide
- Key people: Kobus Gertenbach (CEO); Iaan van Heerden (Non-executive Chairman)
- Products: Food
- Revenue: ▲ R930 million (2026)
- Operating income: ▲ R873 million (2026)
- Net income: ▲ R950 million (2026)
- Total assets: ▲ R15.37 billion (2026)
- Total equity: ▲ R15.34 billion (2026)
- Number of employees: 8,600 (2024)
- Parent: Premier Group Limited
- Website: premierfmcg.com

Premier FMCG (Pty) Ltd, commonly referred to as Premier, is a South African food manufacturer. The company is headquartered in Waterfall City, Midrand, just north of Johannesburg in Gauteng. Founded in 1824, it is one of South Africa's oldest companies.

Premier owns many well-known South African food brands, including Blue Ribbon, Snowflake, Manhattan, Mister Sweet and Lil-lets. The company also has a Lil-Lets sales office in the United Kingdom.

The company exports food and personal care products from South Africa and the UK to other markets, including countries throughout Africa, the United Kingdom, Ireland, the United States, and the Middle East.

== History ==
Premier Milling Company Ltd (sometimes referred to simply as Premier) was established in 1913 by Joffe Marks, as the successor business to Marks & Co (Founded 1890), which began with a single mill at Fordsburg, and quickly expanded to include flour and maize mills in Newtown, the acquisition of Union Flour Mills and the Vereeniging Milling Company (1934) which evolved into Epic Oil Mills and EPOL animal feeds.

Marks and his nephews of the Jaffee and Bloom families expanded and diversified the business into an industrial giant, becoming the largest industrial food producer in the Southern Hemisphere, and employing as many as 49,000 people.

As Premier grew, it incorporated more bakeries, mills, product lines and brands. In 1964 Premier acquired the South African Milling Company (which originated from Attwell's Bakery, founded in 1820), and added divisions for Pharmaceuticals, Cash & Carry, Retail, Entertainment & Fisheries (See "World Fishing Fleets: An Analysis of Distant-water Fleet Operations Past, Present Future", Nov. 1993, NOAA).

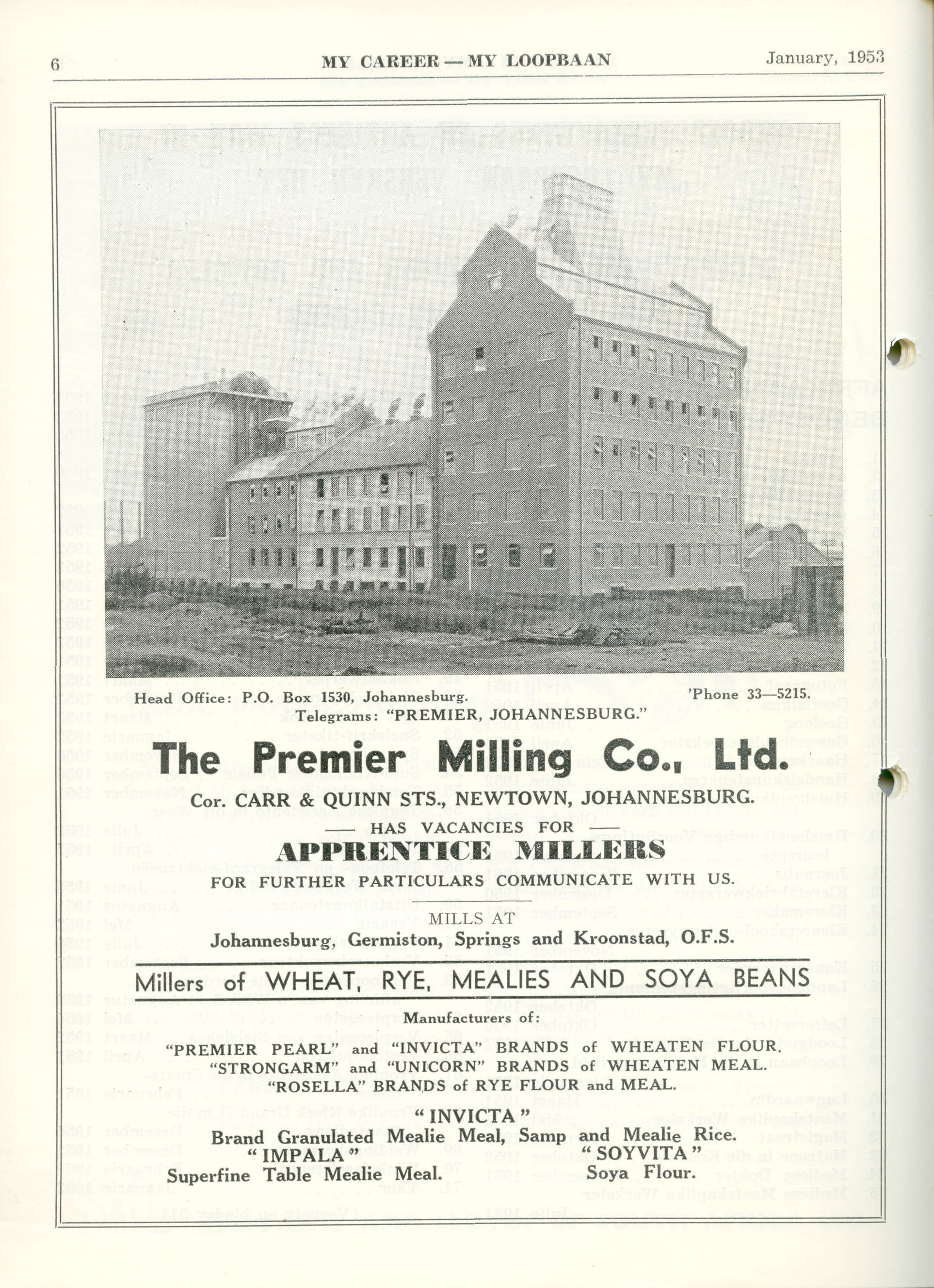
Premier Milling - Circa 1953

In the mid-1960s, a controlling interest was acquired from the Jaffee/Bloom families by Associated British Foods PLC ("Westons"). Within two decades Premier's assets had grown to $1.67 billion, and Westons sold its 52% stake to a consortium led by the Anglo American Corporation for $314 million.

As part of the deal, Anglo American agreed to sell a 34% stake in South African Breweries (later becoming SABMiller PLC, Anheuser-Busch InBev), valued at $716 million, to Premier in exchange for additional Premier shares.

In 1985, Premier's Chairman, Tony Bloom, along with several other of South Africa's most powerful business leaders, openly defied President P.W. Botha by meeting with the exiled ANC leadership in Lusaka, Zambia, to discuss social, political and economic reform.

"[Bloom]...campaigned vigorously for the immediate release of political prisoners, including ANC leader Nelson Mandela, for the end of the state of emergency and for other steps that would permit negotiations on a new constitutional system based on the principle of one person, one vote."

In 2011, international investment group Brait S.E. became the strategic long-term shareholder in Premier Foods.

In 2012, Premier Foods entered Eswatini through the acquisition of a controlling stake in Mr. Bread and Swaziland United Bakeries (S.U.B.), and in 2013, the company acquired Manhattan Confectionery and Lil-lets (South Africa and United Kingdom).

Premier further expanded its African footprint in 2015, with the acquisition of the Companhia Industrial da Matola (CIM) business, a leading food producing company in Mozambique with a diversified product range, comprising wheat flour, maize meal, pasta, biscuits and animal feed. In 2021, Premier acquired Mister Sweet broadening its exposure to the confectionery category.

Premier Group Limited listed on the JSE in March 2023.

In January 2026, Premier announced its intention to acquire major South African food manufacturer RFG. Later that same month, the South African Competition Commission recommended that the acquisition be approved by the Competition Tribunal, subject to conditions, stating that the transaction is unlikely to lessen or prevent competition in any market. To address employment concerns, the parties will undertake not to retrench any employees as a result of the merger, for a period of three years. For the same three-year period, Premier also committed to increase its combined annual spend on enterprise and supplier development initiatives.

In June 2026, it was reported that Premier had been appointed as the new manufacturer of multiple private label confectionery products for major South African retail chain Woolworths.

== Operations ==
As of 2024, Premier operated 13 bakeries, 7 wheat mills, 3 maize mills, a sugar confectionery plant, a feminine hygiene manufacturing plant, a biscuit plant, a pasta plant, and an animal feeds plant. The company has 28 distribution depots in South Africa, Eswatini, Lesotho and Mozambique, and a Lil-Lets sales office in the UK.

== Brands ==
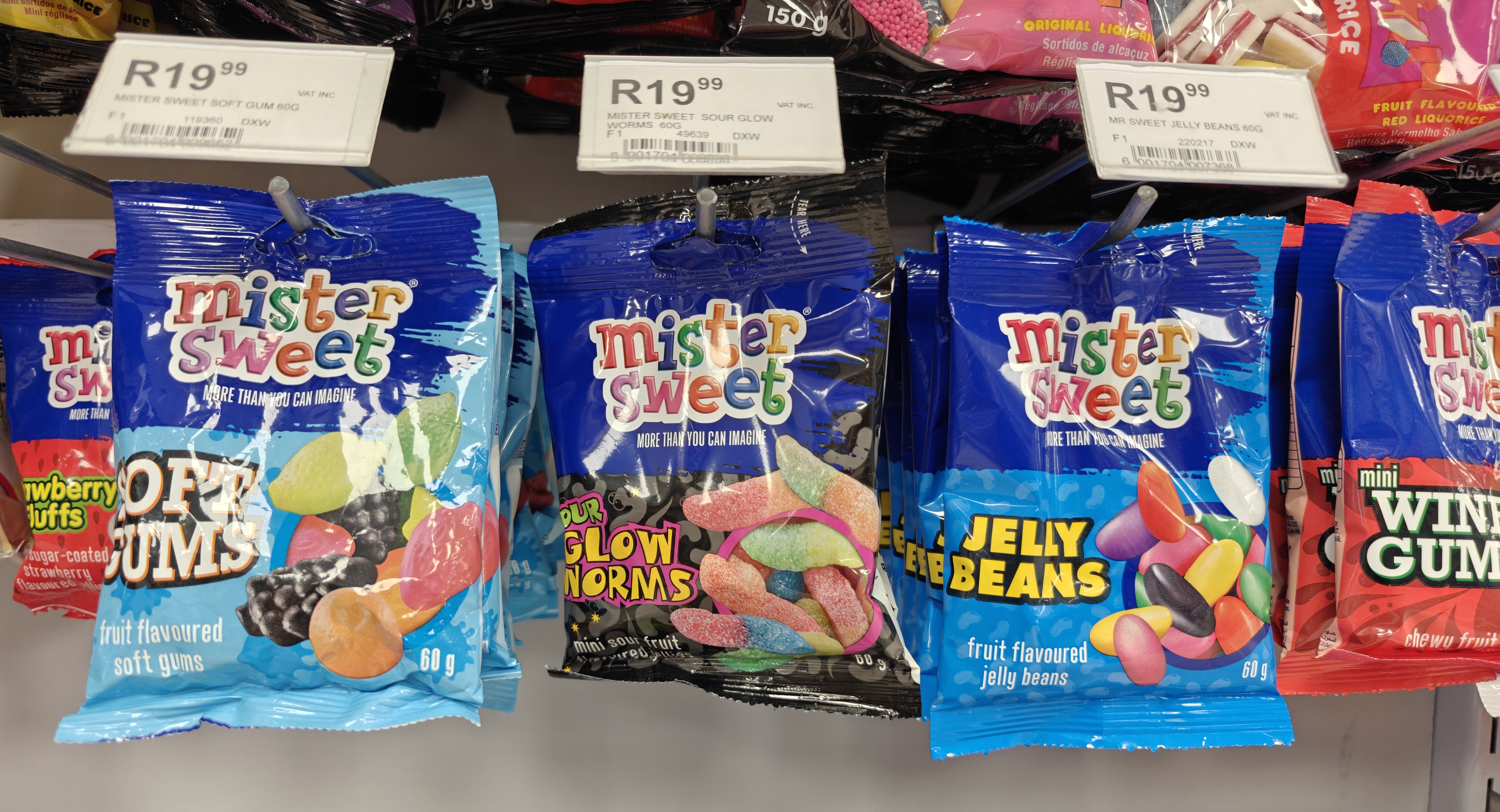
Premier FMCG's Mister Sweet confectionery products in a Cape Town Clicks store

Premier owns brands across a number of categories, including staple foods, confectionery, personal care, and home care. As of mid-2026, these include:

- Bread: Blue Ribbon, BB, Star Bakeries, Mister Bread, S.U.B
- Pasta: Polana, Sunblest
- Rice: Crown Select, Dourado, Sunblest
- Maize: Impala, Invicta, Iwisa, Nyala, Celeste, Top Score, Lugugu, Super Sun, Mega Star
- Canned fruit: Rhodes
- Canned meat: Bull Brand
- Canned vegetables: Rodes, Gold Dish, Pakco
- Seasoning: Hinds, Bisto, Pakco
- Jam: Rhodes, Hazeldene
- Pickled goods: Hinds, Rhodes, Pakco
- Baking goods: Snowflake, Buffalo, Hinds, Today
- Wheat: Snowflake, Bakers Pride, Flavorita, Florbela
- Pies: Big Jack, Magpie, Mama's Pies, Man's Meal
- Beverages: Rhodes, Mandla, Iwisa, Nyala
- Confectionery: CIM, Candy Tops, Champion, Frutus, Manhattan, Mister Sweet, Rascals, Super C
- Personal care: Dove, Dr White's, Lil-lets
- Cleaning: Vulco
- Animal feed: Fepro
