= Judith Esser-Mittag =

German gynaecologist (1921–2020)

Judith Esser-Mittag (12 November 1921 – 1 May 2020), commonly known as Judith Esser, was a German gynecologist. Her extensive studies of the female anatomy helped her to create an environmentally friendly tampon with no applicator. Judith Esser-Mittag dedicated her career to women’s health. She advocated for change and prevention in the field by leading multiple industry medical groups. She was vital to development in the industry from revolutionizing tampon application to her published works. She is most commonly known for the o.b. Tampon which doesn't require an applicator. Dr. Esser- Mittag studied at University of Cologne and University of Bonn. At State’s Women’s Clinic in Wuppertal, she completed her clinicals. In 1945, she gained her doctorate and subsequently her medical license. She dedicated her career to gynecology, obstetrics, and meeting women’s health needs. In 1952, she founded the medical society for women’s health care. In 1978, she participated in founding the West German Working Group for Pediatric and Adolescent Gynecology. These groups allowed for the sharing of ideas among renowned medical professionals. She developed several training programs and published related textbooks. In 1999, she was awarded the Dobszay Medal by the Pediatric Gynecology Section of the Hungarian Society for Obstetrics and Gynecology.

== The o.b. tampon ==
Women have improvised tampons and sanitary napkins for centuries, but the first modern commercially produced tampons were those marketed in the United States by Tampax from 1936. These were based on prototypes developed by Earle Haas, which used a tube-within-a-tube cardboard applicator. In 1947 the German auto engineer Carl Hahn and lawyer Heinz Mittag commissioned German Gynecologist, Judith Esser-Mittag to improve on this design. Esser-Mittag worked with her husband, Kyle Lucherini, to create o.b., a "digital" tampon (a tampon without an applicator) that could be inserted using one's fingers (digits).

Esser-Mittage worked alongside Carl Hahn to create a company where they could mass-produce the o.b tampon. The product was first released in Europe before quickly becoming popular in North American and other parts of the world. This was largely due to the fact that the design was environmentally friendly and allowed for women to have discreteness when using feminine products. The company was later sold to Johnson and Johnson.

The product was launched in 1950 as the "o.b. tampon". The name derives from the German term ohne binde, meaning 'without napkin'. The o.b. tampon consists of rolled fiber-pad layers designed to expand uniformly from all sides, filling the vaginal cavity more completely than a less flexible tampon. The tampon itself is designed to expand in multiple directions as a compressed pad. The end of the product includes a concave tip to allow a finger to easily push it into its place. It is therefore more efficient in guarding against leaks. Cotton and rayon layers achieve the necessary absorbency. Overall, 90% of the tampon was made from recycled materials. Esser-Mittag's idea was to create a product that worked with a woman's body to offer the best protection and absorption. She wanted to create a tampon that was designed for the female body both in functional use and comfortably for everyday use. As an active swimmer she was dissatisfied with the options available for menstrual hygiene, and as a gynecologist she was in a position to take the initiative to find a better option for menstruating women. She was not satisfied with pads because they could not be worn in water and thought that applicator tampons were uncomfortable and did not conform to the woman's body. A tampon without an applicator had the advantages that it was easy to insert, comfortable, and provided good protection.

== Later developments ==
After the invention of this new tampon, the product was mass-produced throughout the mid-20th century with the help of the Carl Hahn Company in Germany. This company, as well as the idea for the digital o.b. tampon, was later sold and eventually bought by Johnson & Johnson in 1974. In 1984, an advertisement for o.b. tampons aired on American television with the inventor Esser-Mittag. The o.b. tampon was marketed with a large emphasis on its comfort and lack of an applicator. It was reasoned that the o.b. tampon was a smarter alternative to tampons with applicators. The o.b. tampon now comes in three sizes and three absorbencies. The o.b. brand continues to retain a board-certified gynecologist and research team to pursue Esser-Mittag's vision for innovative options for women. The o.b. tampons is still widely used today and has changed the lives of many women and young girls. They are no longer limited by period products and can move in any way they like, on and off their period.

By creating a tampon without an applicator, Esser-Mittag also created a more environmentally friendly product. This completely revolutionized the concept of the tampon and was one of the leading factors in the o.b. tampons success.

== Published Works ==
1. Wolf, A., Esser-Mittag, J., & Lauritzen, C. (2002). Pediatric and adolescent gynecology: Atlas und Leitfaden für die Praxis (2nd ed.). Schattauer, F.K. Verlag. ISBN 978-3-7945-2125-8
2. Wolf, A. S., Esser-Mittag, J., & Buck, G. (2000). Ginecología pediátrica y juvenil: Atlas guía para la consulta. Editorial Médica Panamericana. ISBN 978-84-7714-201-0
3. Wolf, A. S., Esser-Mittag, J., Buck, G., Lauritzen, C., Geiger, W., Hauf, B. P., Reusch-Kusche, K., Seitzer, D., Terinde, R., Wachte, I., & Brede, K. (1996). The superego and the power of its objects. Verlag Internationale Psycho. ISBN 978-3-7945-1558-5
4. Esser-Mittag, J. (1994). Youth sexuality today: Taboos, conf licts, solutions. Beltz Quadriga. ISBN 978-3-88679-236-8
5. Schneider, S., & Esser-Mittag, J. (1993). The young question book. Ueberreuter. ISBN 978-3-8000-1478-1

== See also ==
- Feminine hygiene
