= Thinx =

American feminine hygiene product company

- Industry: Feminine hygiene
- Founded: 2014; 12 years ago
- Founders: Radha Agrawal; Miki Agrawal; Antonia Dunbar
- Headquarters: New York City, New York, U.S.
- Key people: Meghan Davis (CEO)
- Products: Period underwear, incontinence underwear, organic tampons, reusable tampon applicator
- Brands: Thinx, Speax, (BTWN)
- Website: www.thinx.com

Thinx is a New York–based company that sells period underwear, an undergarment designed to be as absorbent as traditional feminine hygiene products. Since 2022, Kimberly-Clark has had a majority stake in the business.

== History ==
Thinx was founded in 2011 by Antonia Saint Dunbar, Miki Agrawal, and Radha Agrawal. In 2018, Thinx released a new line called (BTWN), which offers period underwear for teens and tweens. In June 2019, Thinx released Thinx Air, a quick-drying version of its underwear. As of 2021, Thinx has released its first activewear collection, which includes leggings, cycle shorts, training shorts, and leotards that are available in multiple colors. The four-piece collection functions like other Thinx underwear, but the gusset design is longer and shaped differently to accommodate active lifestyles. Miki Agrawal stepped down as CEO in 2017, after a former employee alleged that she had engaged in inappropriate office behavior. Maria Molland took over as CEO, and under her leadership, Thinx was placed on shelves in Target and Walmart.

In 2019, Kimberly-Clark made a minority investment in Thinx, and in February 2022, it acquired a majority stake in the company. In May 2022, Maria Molland stepped down as CEO, and the company appointed Meghan Davis as its new CEO.

=== Lawsuits ===
In 2020, lawsuits were filed against Thinx alleging misleading marketing following an independent test of the company's products that revealed the presence of per- and polyfluoroalkyl substances (PFAS), a type of chemical found in consumer products and linked to numerous long-term health risks. The lawsuits called into question whether Thinx marketing claim that its products were "organic, sustainable and nontoxic" was deceptive. In May 2022, the lawsuits were combined into a proposed class action, and the company reached a settlement in the case in November. In January 2023, the terms of the settlement were announced to consumers, which included no admission of wrongdoing and the company agreeing to pay up to US$5 million to consumers. Thinx also put out a statement alleging that PFAS are not part of the product design and going forward, it would ensure PFAS are not added to its products.

On January 29, 2024, CEO Meghan Davis announced on a company-wide Zoom call that 95 of the 109 staff members would be losing their jobs on May 1. Five of the laid-off employees were offered positions as employees of Kimberly-Clark, Thinx's parent company. Later reporting indicated the number of employees integrated into Kimberly-Clark was a less striking thirty-two.

== Products ==
Thinx underwear comes in a range of styles from boyshorts to thongs and includes two patented technologies. One is to absorb different amounts of blood, and the other absorbs different amounts of urine. The underwear has been reported as being antimicrobial, moisture-wicking, absorbent, and leak resistant. In 2019, Thinx launched Thinx Super, which is a double-absorbency product that claims to hold up to four tampons' worth of flow. The underwear cost about $35 per pair. Thinx introduced a pair that cost $17 in order to better compete with new lines of period underwear from large brands like Aerie and Hanes.

== Marketing ==
Thinx earned a reputation for its controversial ads. In October 2015, Outfront Media rejected Thinx's subway advertisements due to the fact that the ads used the word "period" and included suggestive visuals of food. Following a social media outcry, the ads were finally allowed to be shown. In 2016, Thinx received attention for featuring trans male models in its ads for period underwear. In November 2016, Thinx launched an ad referencing the Donald Trump Access Hollywood tape. The San Francisco subway banned the ads due to the use of the word "pussy". In November 2017, they created a "PMS truck", a truck visiting three cities, allowing visitors to step inside to shop for Thinx products and talk with brand representatives regarding period health. In 2019, Thinx rolled out a national ad campaign featuring a young boy getting his first period with the tagline: "What if we all had periods?" and subsequent campaigns focused on reducing period stigma by showcasing men. These ads were banned by several TV networks including CBS for being "too graphic".

After 2019, employees noticed that Thinx's marketing direction changed, featuring fewer images of people in underwear, and treating periods like something to hide. In 2022, a television showed a mom starting to demonstrate tampon use to her daughter before a sister interrupts the scene with Thinx underwear, saying "Mom won't have to show you how to use them." Employees felt that Thinx's advertising no longer destigmatized menstruation.

== Reception ==
TIME named Thinx period panties as one of the best inventions of 2015. Fast Company named Thinx one of the most innovative companies of 2017, pointing to founder Agrawal's promotional campaigns and her application of "high-tech merchandise, considered design, and a rule-breaking philosophy" to launches of new products.

In 2019 Thinx leaders signed a letter condemning the abortion bans being put into place across the country.

== See also ==
- Menstrual cup
- Period underwear
- Tampon
- Lunapads
- Pantyliners
