= Shi Wenbo =

Chinese hygiene products industry executive (1950–2026)

- Born: 1950; China
- Died: 29 September 2026 (aged 75–76)
- Known for: Chairman, Hengan International
- Spouse: Married
- Children: 1

Shi Wenbo (Chinese: 施文博; 1950 – 29 September 2026) was a Chinese billionaire businessman, who was chairman of Hengan International.

== Early life and career ==
In 1950, Shi was born in Quanzhou, Fujian province, China.

In 1985, Shi co-founded Hengan International with Xu Lianjie, and they produce sanitary napkins and baby diapers.

As of February 2016, Shi was listed as the 66th richest man in China by Forbes who estimated his net worth at US$2.1 billion.

== Philanthropy ==
In 2010, Shi was ranked #13 in Top 20 Chinese Philanthropists of 2010. Shi's company donated $124.61 million yuan ($19.2M USD) to charity.

== Personal life and death ==
In 1975, Shi moved to Hong Kong. Shi had a son, Wong Kim Sze. As of 2020, he lived in Jinjiang, Fujian, China.

Shi died on 29 September 2026.

== See also ==
- One Foundation
