= Period underwear =

Menstrual garment

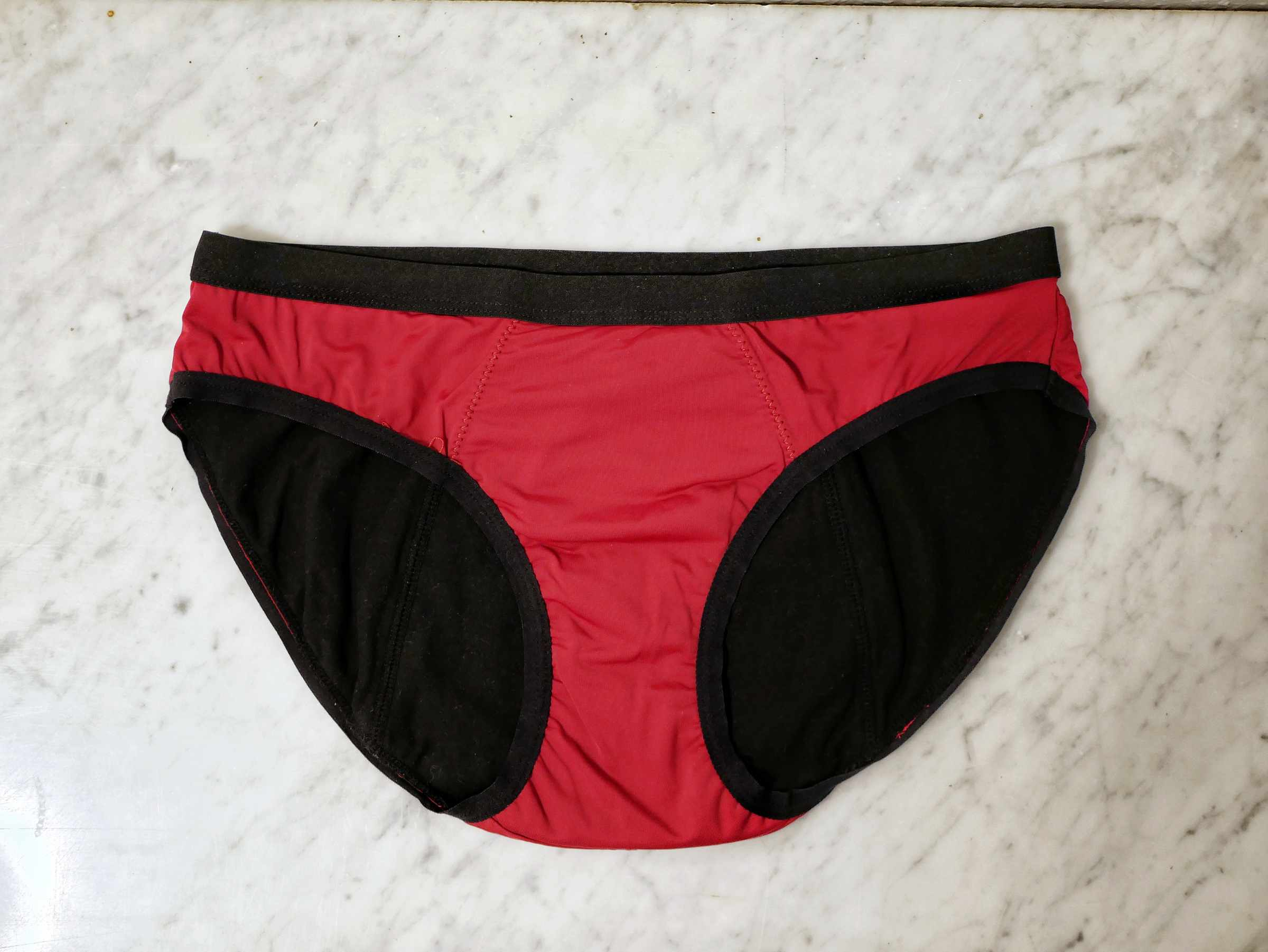
Red and black period panties

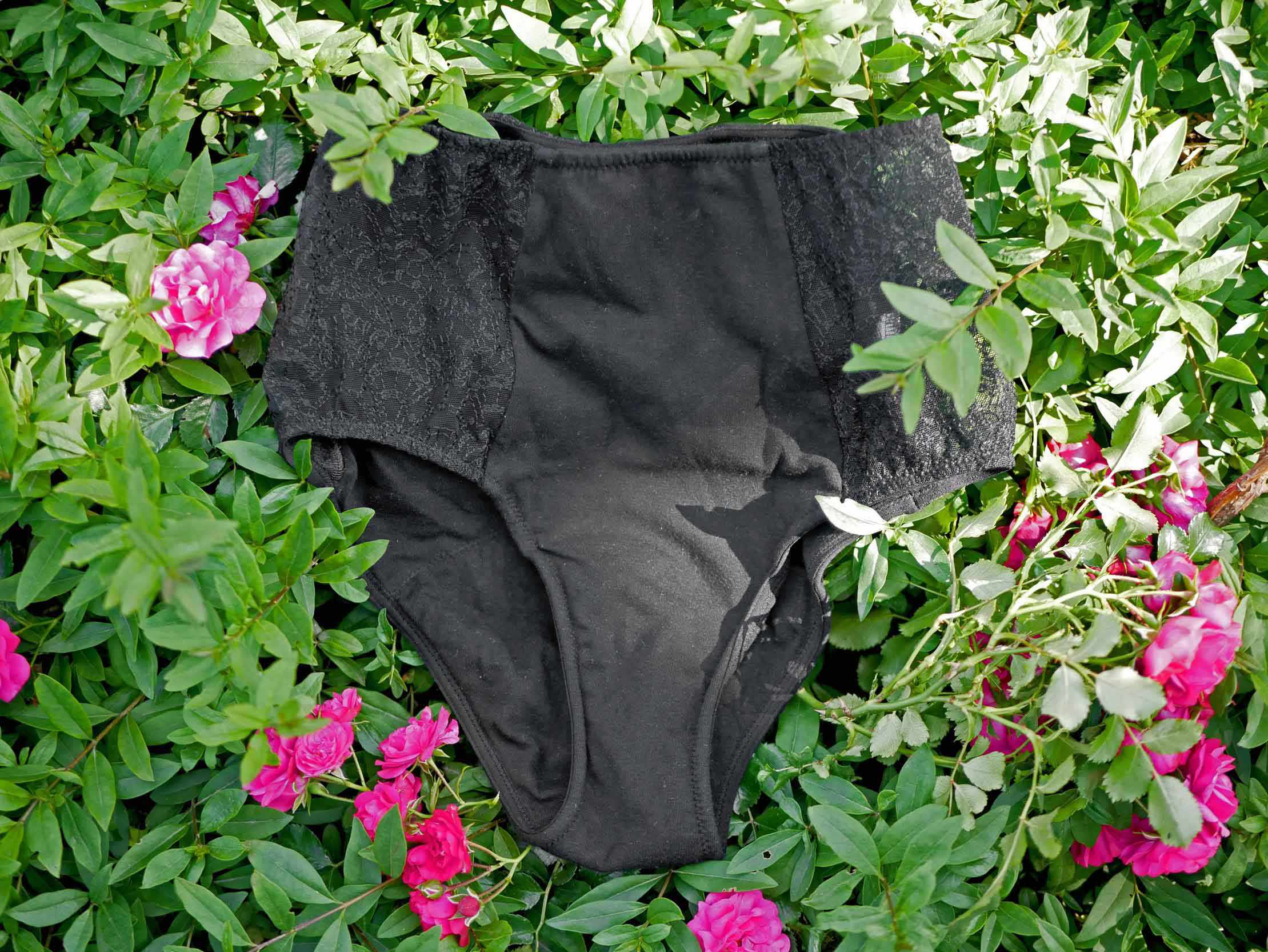
Black period panties

Period underwear (also known as menstrual underwear or period panties) are absorbent garments designed to be worn during menstruation, as an alternative or backup to other menstrual products. Period underwear is designed like conventional underwear but it is made up of highly absorbent fabrics to soak up menstrual blood. Most commercially manufactured period underwear makes use of microfiber polyester fabric. It is recommended that period underwear should be changed at least once every 8-12 hours to ensure optimal hygiene and comfort.

== Overview ==
The market for period underwear has developed as a response to consumer preference moving away from traditional menstrual hygiene management products, such as sanitary pads and tampons. Different brands use different, often patented, technology for anti-microbial action, moisture-wicking and optimal absorption.

Julie Sygiel was cited by the BBC in 2015 as an early developer of the technology, with her company 'Dear Kate'.

Period underwear is considered to be an eco-friendly way to cut down on waste and reduce spending. It is estimated that the disposal of menstrual products generates 200,000 tonnes of plastic waste in the United Kingdom each year.

Nancy Redd, a writer for The New York Times, described the product's features: "some menstrual-underwear styles are gorgeous but leaky, and others have Hoover Dam–level security but diaper-like silhouettes. The style that will be best for you depends on your period flow and preferences".

Some manufacturers of period underwear are extending their ranges into other leak-proof clothes such as swimsuits, sportswear and sleepwear.

In the United Kingdom, period underwear was subject to value-added tax at 20% until 2024, despite the fact that other menstrual products were exempted from the tax in 2021. The exemption for period underwear was brought in after tampon tax campaigners petitioned for the tax to be removed.

== Risks ==
Some companies (like Thinx, Ruby Love, and Knix) are facing class action lawsuits for period underwear products that contain potentially harmful toxins like per- and polyfluoroalkyl substances (PFAS) which may be linked to adverse health outcomes like cancer. Thinx settled a lawsuit in January 2023 but made no admission of guilt or wrongdoing in the settlement. Some brands of period underwear have been found to contain silver used as an antimicrobial agent. Concerns have been raised about the possible health impact of silver migrating into the body, but limited research has been done and little scientific data exists.

== See also ==
- Incontinence underwear - similar in concept, but not generally interchangeable with period underwear due to differences in volume and speed of flow between menstrual blood and urine.
- Menstrual cup
- Cloth menstrual pad
- Menstrual Hygiene Day
- Menstrual hygiene management
