= Aisle (company) =

Canadian female hygiene company

- Formerly: Lunapads
- Industry: Menstrual products
- Founded: 1995; 31 years ago
- Founder: Madeleine Shaw
- Headquarters: Vancouver, Canada
- Products: Cloth menstrual pads, underwear, menstrual cups
- Website: periodaisle.com

Aisle (known as Lunapads from 1993 to 2019) is a Canadian company that manufactures washable feminine hygiene products, including cloth menstrual pads, period underwear, and menstrual cups.

== Overview ==
=== History ===
The products were designed and created by fashion designer Madeleine Shaw in 1993. Shaw wrote the first business plan for Lunapads in 1994, and in 1995 opened a store and small production facility. In 1999 Lunapads was co-founded with Suzanne Siemens, an accountant that Shaw met at a community leadership course. The companies mission was "to create a more positive and informed relationship between woman and their bodies and the Earth".

Lunapads mentored AFRIpads, a project started to help resolve the issue of girls in developing nations missing school due to a lack of adequate sanitary protection and resources available to manage their periods.

In 2020, Lunapads rebranded as Aisle.

=== Description ===
Lunapads were a liner-on-top style cloth menstrual pad as opposed to the more common "envelope" style. The pads have two parts; a Pad Base which snaps around the underwear of the wearer and a Liner Insert which is inserted under two bands on either end of the pad. Each pad consists of two layers of cotton flannel base topped with a central pad made of one layer of nylon and two layers of cotton fleece with bands at either end to hold liners. This product was discontinued in 2020, and replaced with a design using technical cotton.

== See also ==
- Cloth menstrual pad
- Menstrual cup
- Menstrual cycle
