= Cloth menstrual pad =

Cloth pads to prevent menstrual fluid from leaking onto clothes

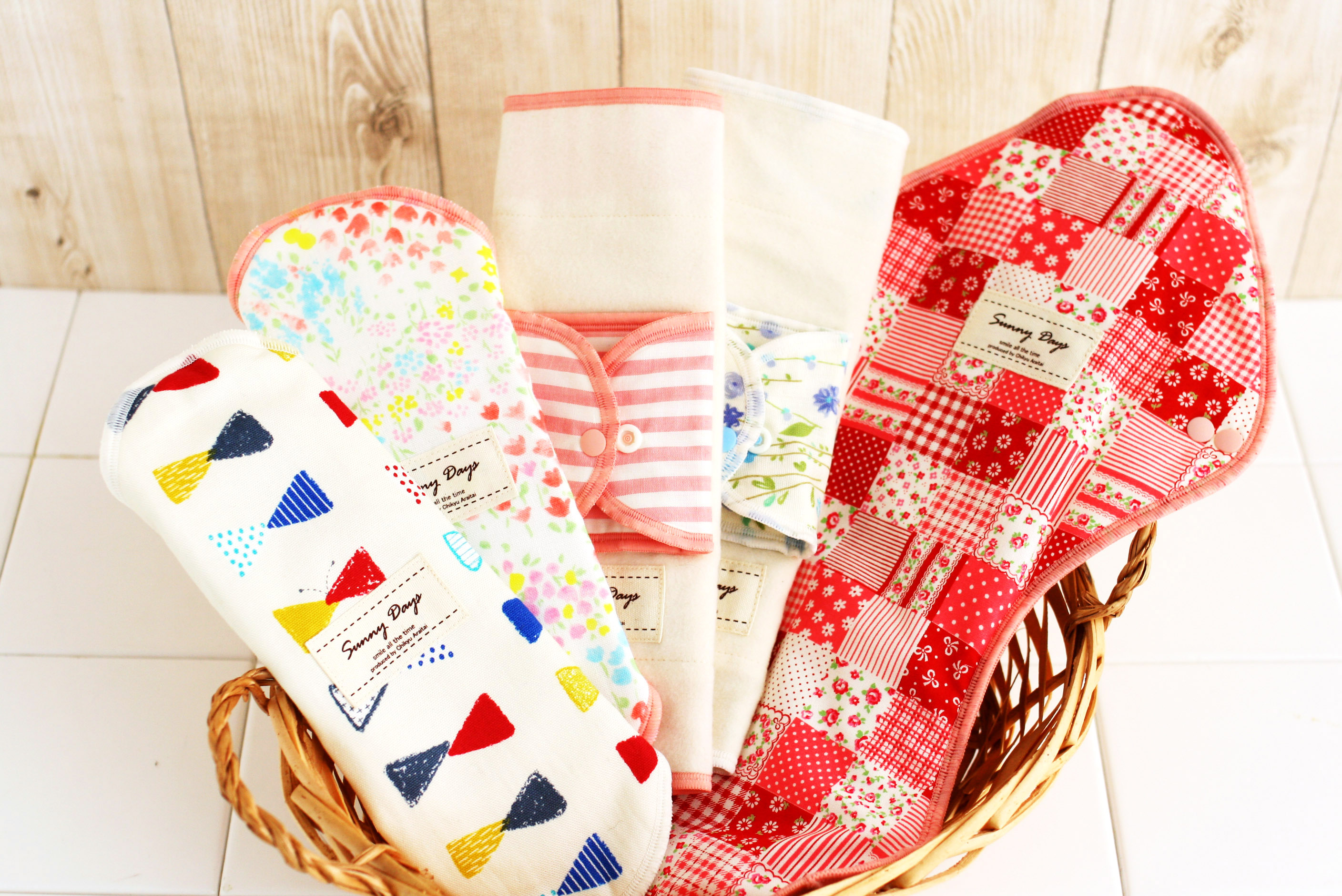
Basket of various cloth menstrual pads

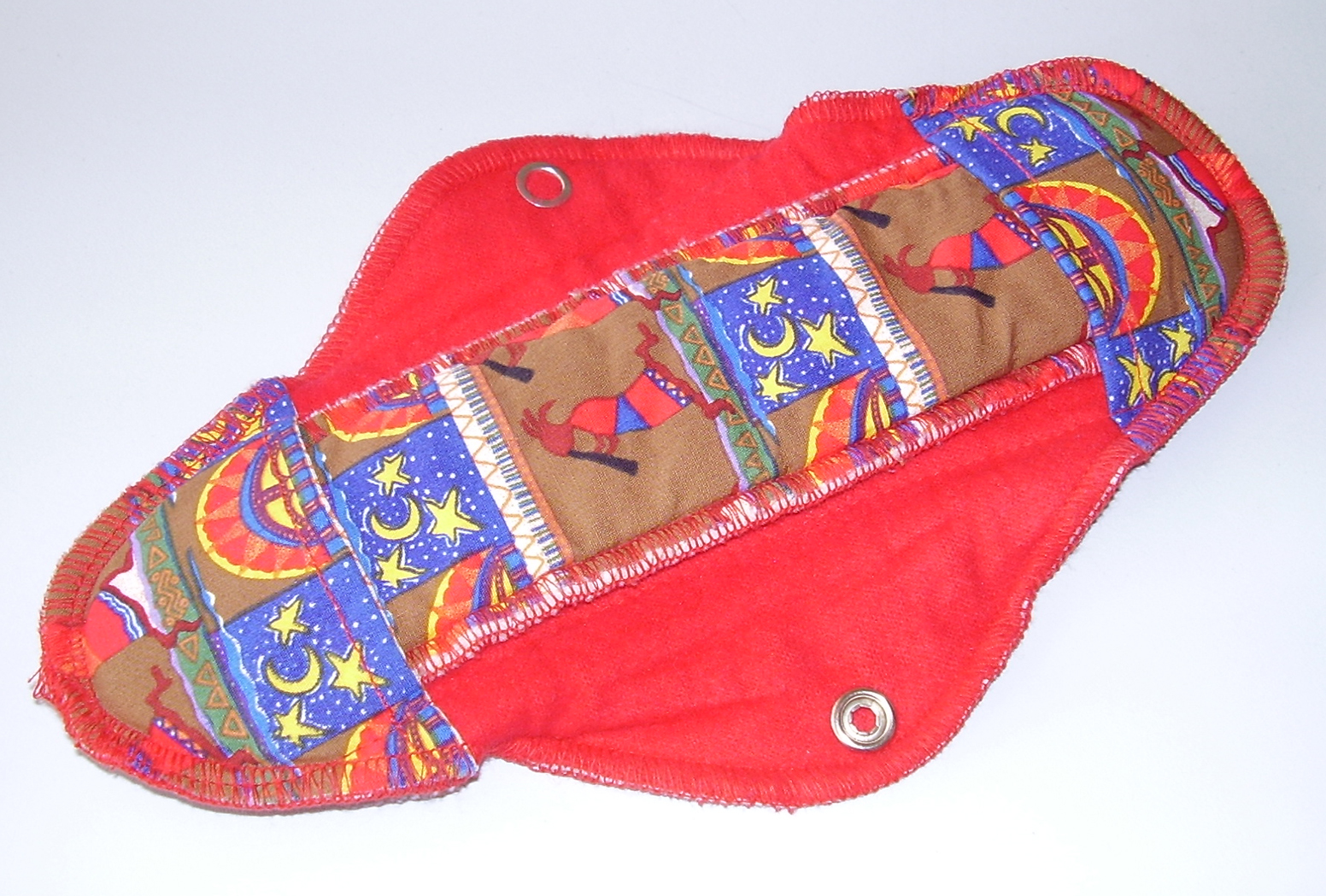
Reusable cloth menstrual pad with Kokopelli motif.

Cloth menstrual pads are cloth pads worn in the underwear to collect menstrual fluid (blood from uterine lining). They are a type of reusable menstrual hygiene product, and are an alternative to disposable sanitary napkins, tampons and menstrual cups. Because they can be reused, they are generally less expensive than disposable pads over time, and reduce the amount of waste produced.

Generally they are made from layers of absorbent fabrics (such as cotton or hemp) which are worn during menstruation, post-birth bleeding or any other situation where it is necessary to absorb the flow of blood from the vagina, or to protect underwear from regular discharge of vaginal fluids. After use, they are washed, dried and then reused.

== History ==
Through the ages women have used different forms of menstrual protection. Women often used strips of folded old cloth (rags) to catch their menstrual blood, which is why the term "on the rag" was used to refer to menstruation.

Disposable menstrual pads appear to have been first commercially available from around 1888 with the Southall's pad. More widely successful disposable menstrual pads had their start during the World War I, when French nurses used Kimberly-Clark's wood pulp bandages as a menstrual pad that could be thrown away after use. Kotex's first advertisement for products made with this wood pulp appeared in 1921.

Until the advent of disposable pads, women used a variety of sewn or makeshift pads made from a variety of fabrics, often leftover scraps, to collect menstrual blood, although some women have used anything absorbent. Fabrics could generally be washed and used again. When disposable pads were introduced, they were too expensive for many women to afford. When they could be afforded, women were allowed to place money in a box so that they would not have to speak to the clerk and take a box of Kotex pads from the counter themselves. It took several years for disposable menstrual pads to become commonplace. However, they are now used nearly exclusively in most of the industrialized world.

Cloth menstrual pads made a comeback around 1970. With the number of cloth pad manufacturers and online communities devoted to this increasing in the 1990s and the early 2000s, they appear to be gaining popularity.

=== Current use ===
The majority of commercially available pads are manufactured by work-at-home moms or small businesses and can be purchased through some health food stores, specialty stores, and via Internet stores and marketplaces. They are available in a range of lengths and thicknesses, similar to disposable pads, with longer pads for night use and thinner and shorter pads for light use. Some manufacturers will allow the buyer to select the fabrics, shape and size of the pad so that they can be custom made to fit an individual and be as efficient as possible.

Some people make their own cloth menstrual pads. These pads range from folded washcloths to pads similar to the cloth menstrual pads available commercially.

Cloth menstrual pads may be hand- or machine-washed, and then dried on a clothes line or in a clothes dryer, depending on the instructions from the manufacturer. (Different fabrics require different care methods.) Some people choose to rinse out their pads in cold water before putting them in the wash with their other clothing. Others do not rinse, but put the soiled pads straight into the wash. After washing it is recommended that the pads are dried in a hygienic area under direct sunlight. Sunlight acts as a disinfectant and prevents microbial growth, which may happen if the pads are not completely dry.

When changing cloth menstrual pads away from home, some people place the soiled pads into a waterproof or Ziploc bag to keep them from drying out and to contain or prevent odor and then wash the pads when convenient.

The fabrics used range from 100% natural fibres to 100% synthetics. Some commonly used fabrics include terrycloth, cotton, silk, hemp, and Gore-Tex. Specialty fabrics such as hemp, bamboo terry, bamboo velour, soy French terry, wool interlock and polyurethane laminate (PUL) may be used. PUL may be purchased from online nappy/diaper supply stores.

Some styles of cloth menstrual pad have a waterproof layer to help prevent the pad leaking through while other styles of cloth pad may rely on more layers of absorbency and not include waterproofing. Wool can also be used as a natural, breathable backing that provides leak protection.

==== Developing countries ====
In developing countries, reusable or makeshift pads are still used to collect menstrual blood. People in these countries most often resort to either staying in their rooms during menstruation or using pieces of old cloth/ rags, old mattress foam and even infection-causing items such as leaves, husks, disposed cement bags, etc. Lack of access to feminine hygiene products affects women and adolescent girls around the world. This lack is directly tied to exploitation, school drop out rates, infection, early marriage and even child trafficking. Quality washable menstrual pads are now helping as worldwide awareness is growing - also evidenced by the global initiative of Menstrual Hygiene Day. Many NGOs are coordinating volunteers to sew effective washable pads with moisture barriers that, unlike disposables, can be used month after month.

Effective management of menstruation is an under-recognized challenge for girls in low-income communities. A study in Uganda showed the effects of menstruation and education in communities of poor education, welfare, and health. Girls who received high-quality menstrual pads were less likely to miss school. The girls reported better concentration and participation due to not having to worry about staining their clothes.

Studies have found that between 43% and 88% of girls and women wash and reuse cotton pads in India, rather than utilizing disposable pads. These numbers are particularly dominant in rural areas and low socioeconomic regions. The cotton pads are sometimes not sanitized properly due to washing with soap and unclean water. Due to menstruation's taboo nature, women and girls dry their cotton pads indoors rather than in the sunlight, which may lead girls to reuse improperly sanitized pads leading to infection.

In Somalia, where girls may be absent from school for a week each month due to menstruation, a charity has trained victims of gender-based violence to sew re-usable sanitary pads, which are then purchased for distribution to schools in Mogadishu.

Days for Girls is a global movement based in the US which supplies girls with kits including reusable cloth pads, sewn by volunteers around the world. Each kit is in a draw-string cloth bag with zip closure plastic bags for clean and used pads and other hygiene needs, and enables the girls to continue their schooling with dignity.

== Benefits ==
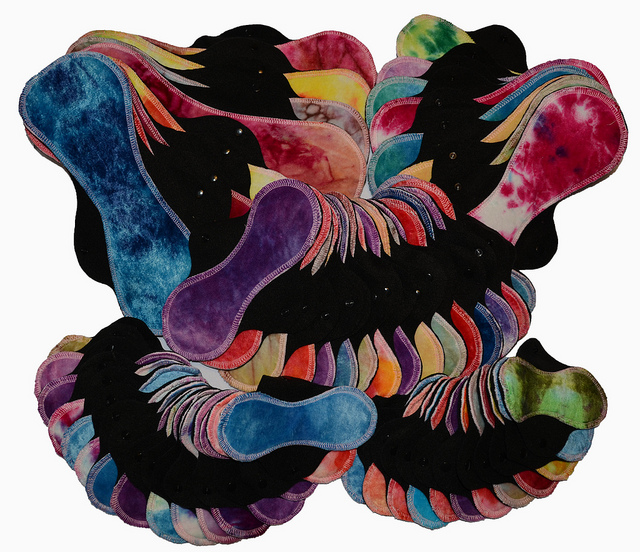
Cloth menstrual pads ranging from liners to overnight pads.

- Cloth menstrual pads are environmentally friendly and do not contribute to landfill as they are reusable and do not come in or contain plastic packaging. When cloth menstrual pads wear out (after years of use), those made from natural materials can be composted whereas disposable sanitary napkins made from synthetic materials cannot be recycled or composted. An estimated 500–800 years are needed to biodegrade a pad, while tampons take six months to biodegrade.
- Fewer synthetic chemicals are used by cloth menstrual products than by disposable products. They create less overall waste compared to disposable menstrual products as they can be made from reused materials, including old pillow-cases, old clothes and towels. Some cloth pads use hemp as the absorbent core which is more environmentally friendly to grow when compared with cotton or wood pulp. Organic options, such as pads made of organic cotton grown without pesticides, are available.
- They can be cleaned in a washing machine or hand-washed.
- It is claimed, without evidence, that some users have shorter or lighter periods or fewer cramps when using cloth pads as opposed to disposable products.
- Cloth menstrual pads, like all menstrual pads, do not pose the risk of toxic shock syndrome associated with tampons.
- Some cloth pad makers run or donate a portion of their proceeds to programs that provide reusable feminine hygiene products (pads or menstrual cups) to girls and women in developing countries so that they can continue to attend school or work while menstruating.
- The average cloth menstrual pad costs about $10 and can last for years depending on care and use. In the long term, this may make them less expensive to buy or make by hand compared to disposable pads.

== Difficulties ==
- Washing reusable pads requires water and detergents, and also electrical power if not hand-washed. Bloody cleaning water must be disposed of safely.
- Cloth menstrual pads need to be washed with soap, properly dried, and cared for.
- Special care may need to be taken if the user has a candidiasis (yeast) infection. Pads can cause reinfection if not sterilized.
- Initial cost for reusable menstrual products is typically higher per pad than for disposables, although total cost of usage is much less.
- Blood-borne pathogens such as hepatitis C are present in the menstrual pads of infected patients, and pose risk of infection if not sealed in leak-proof containers.

== See also ==
- Menstrual pad
- Menstrual Hygiene Day
- Menstrual hygiene management
- Pantyliner
- Period underwear
