= Hengan International =

Chinese manufacturing company

Hengan International Group Company Limited
- Native name: 恆安國際集團有限公司
- Romanized name: Héng'ān Guójì Jítuán Yǒuxiàngōngsī
- Type: Privately owned company
- Traded as: SEHK: 1044; Hang Seng Index component
- Industry: Hygiene products
- Founded: 1985; 41 years ago
- Headquarters: Jinjiang, Fujian, People's Republic of China
- Area served: China
- Key people: Chairman: Shi Wenbo; Deputy chairman and CEO: Vacant
- Products: sanitary napkins, baby diapers, adult diapers
- Website: www.hengan.com

Hengan International Group Company Limited is the largest producer of sanitary napkins and baby diapers in China. It produces sanitary napkin products, disposable baby diapers, adult diapers, and other personal hygiene products.

The company was founded in 1985 by Shi Wenbo (Sze Man Bok, chairman) and Xu Lianjie (Hui Lin Chit, deputy chairman and chief executive officer). It was listed on the Hong Kong Stock Exchange in 1998.
