= Pantyliner =

Absorbent material used for feminine hygiene

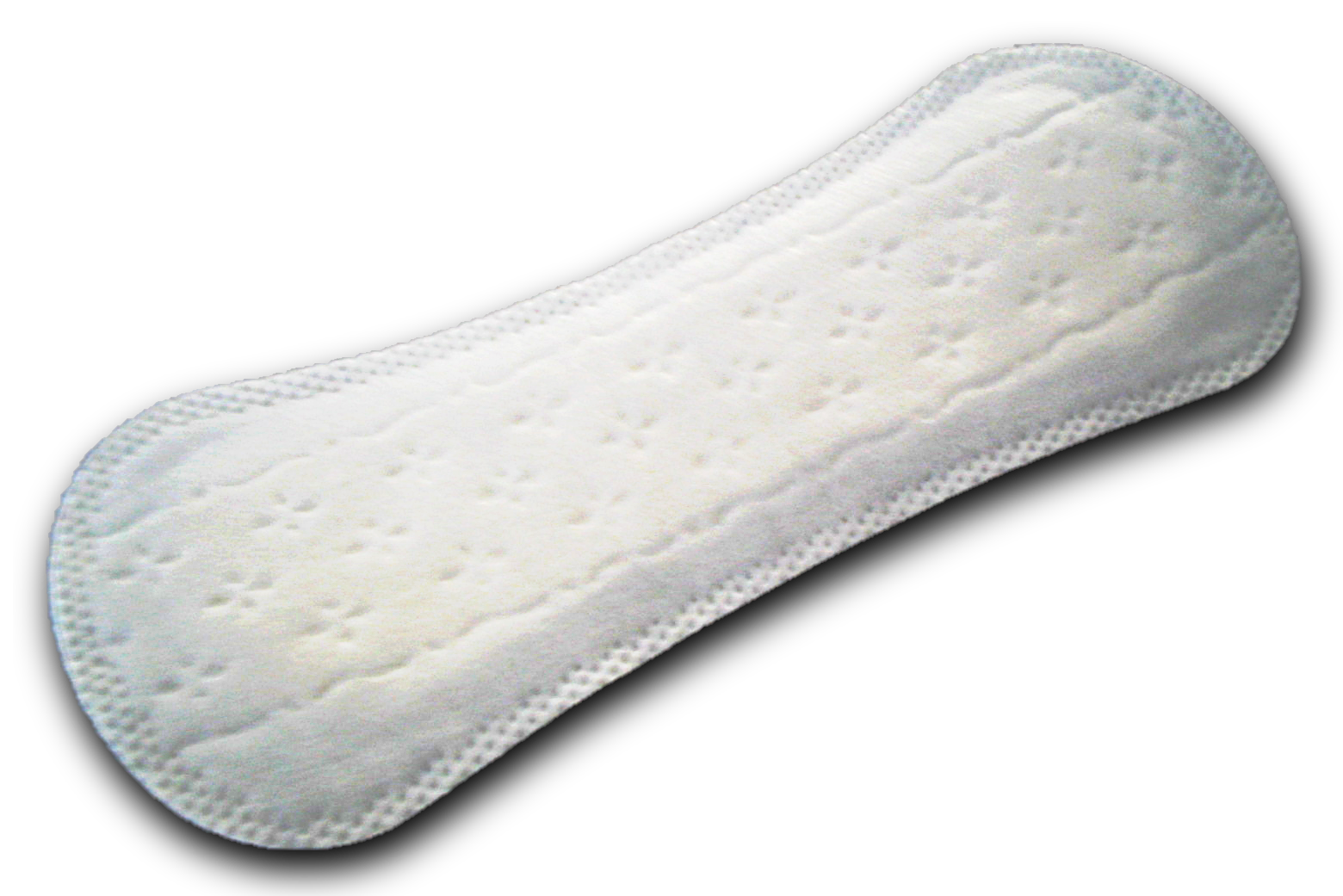
Pantyliner

A pantyliner (also pantiliner or panty liner) is an absorbent piece of material used for feminine hygiene. It is worn in the gusset of a woman's panties (the bottom of the panties between the legs that rests against the vulva). Uses include absorbing ordinary vaginal discharge, light menstrual flow, tampon and menstrual cup backup, spotting, leaking semen that was ejaculated into the vagina or anus during sexual intercourse, and urine in cases of urinary incontinence. Pantyliners are related to menstrual pads in their basic construction but are usually much thinner and often narrower than pads. As a result, they absorb much less liquid than pads, making them suitable for light discharge and everyday cleanliness. They are generally unsuitable for menstruation with medium to heavy flow, which requires them to be changed more often.

There are many variations in pantyliner design for use in different circumstances, including heavy vaginal discharge and light period flow. There are also styles designed to be worn with thong underwear.

Many pantyliners are single-use products, sticking temporarily to underwear with an adhesive. Some also have "wings" that secure the pantyliner to the underwear.
