= Wetness indicator =

Feature in diapers that tells when it's been peed in and wet by a baby

A wetness indicator is a common feature in many diapers and training pants. It is a feature that reacts to liquid as a way to discourage the wearer to pee in the training pants, or as an indicator to a caregiver that a diaper needs changing.

== Types ==
- "Fade when wet" is a feature in most training pants that has small graphics which fade as a reaction to liquid, specifically urine.

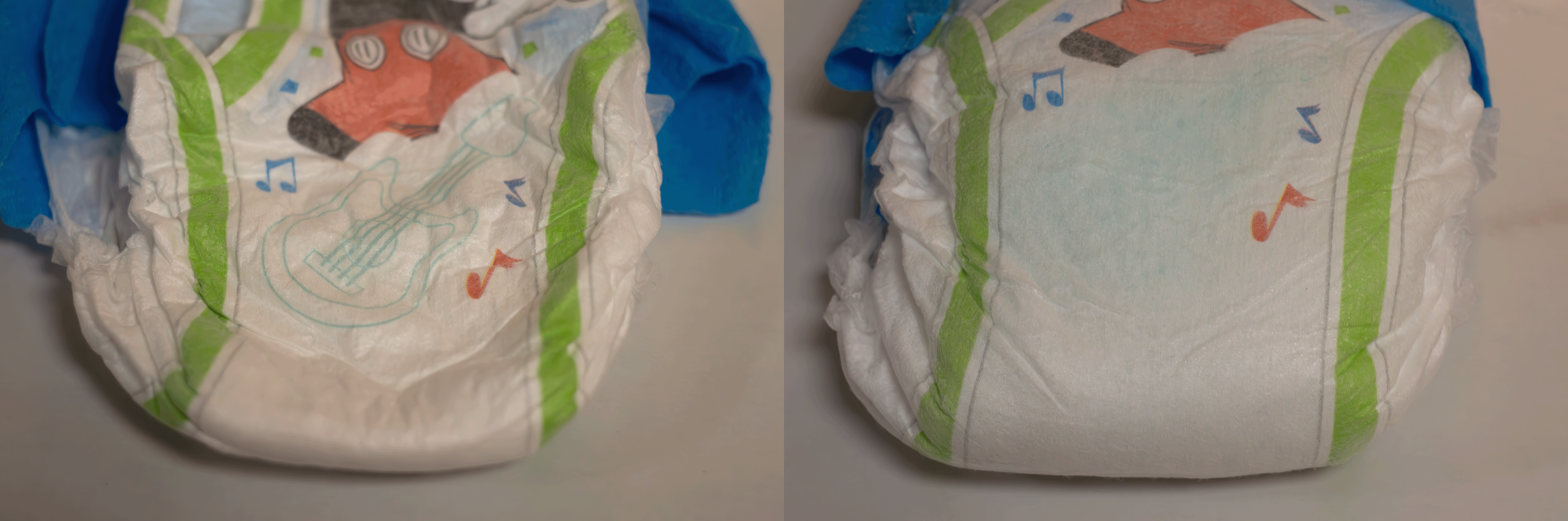
The Wetness indicator on a pair of Huggies Pull-Up's. Left Side is Dry. Right side has pee in it .

- "Feel wet" is a feature used in some training pants that lets the wearer know when they are wet by feeling. Few training pants use this feature anymore.
- "Color Change When Wet" is the most common version of wetness indicator in baby diapers, consisting of a yellow stripe that goes from the front to the back of the diaper. This stripe often includes bromophenol blue, which changes color in accordance to pH. The stripe turns blue after a minute or two as a reaction to urine. During the transition when the wetness indicator is reacting to the baby's urine; the stripe fades or turns an amber color for a few seconds before turning blue. Over time, the stripe becomes less yellow and more blue as the baby wets the diaper, letting the wearer or the caregiver know that the diaper needs to be changed.
- "Bluetooth" wetness indicators are one of the newest types, and allow the parent to use their phone to tell whether or not their baby needs a diaper change instead of having to physically look and see if the fading or color-changing indicators have activated. These attach to the front of the baby's diaper with velcro and use sensors to measure the moisture and temperature in the baby's diaper. If the temperature and/or moisture exceed a certain level, the indicator app will tell the parent that it's time for a change. The apps for some of these also track how many diapers are used in a certain time-frame, letting parents know when they need to buy more.

== History ==
- In 1978, Kimberly-Clark introduced Kleenex Super Dry diapers with "wetness indicators" in the form of a design that fades and lightens as the inside of the diaper becomes wetter. (The Kleenex Super Dry line was later superseded by Kimberley-Clark's higher-end "Huggies" line.)
- In 2000, Huggies introduced and started integrating their new "Learning Designs" feature into all Huggies Pull-Ups training pants. These were small designs on the Pull-Up that use a special ink that fades when exposed to wetness, with an intent to let the wearer know when the wearer is wet or dry and as an incentive for urinating in the toilet instead of in the Pull-Up. But on March 2, 2005, the original Huggies Pull-Ups are now known as Learning Designs. Learning Designs Pull-Ups also have a small star picture on the inside that is digested on, that is also printed on certain ink that evaporates when exposed to feces.
- In 2002, Pampers introduced Easy Ups trainers, which adopted the Learning Designs technique from Huggies Pull-Ups.
- In 2004, Pampers introduced Feel 'N Learn trainers, which not only used the Learning Designs, but also added a wetness liner that lets the wearer know when they are wet by feeling.
- In 2005, Huggies released Pull-Ups Training Pants with Wetness Liner, similar to Pampers Feel 'N Learn.
- In 2010, Huggies and Pampers began including the color-changing line as a wetness indicator for their diapers.
- In 2013, Huggies created an early concept of the Bluetooth wetness indicator, called Tweet Pee. This was a sensor shaped like a blue owl that attached to the front of the diaper and would alert parents through Twitter when the baby had peed the diaper. This product was tested in Brazil, but never reached stores.
- In 2018, Luvs adopted the color-changing wetness indicator.
- Also in 2018, Opro9 created the "Smart Diaper", a temperature and moisture sensor that attaches to the front of the baby's diaper, using a silicone sleeve with adhesive, similar to a band-aid. The sensor links to the parent's phone via Bluetooth, and sends an alert when the temperature and moisture inside the diaper exceed a certain threshold.
