= Goodnites =

Brand of disposable undergarments

Goodnites Pull Up Diapers
- Most recent logo design for the brand being discussed.
- Type: Diapers
- Material: Sodium Polyacrylate; Polypropylene; Wood Pulp; Polyethylene; Polyurethane/polyolefin elastics Adhesives; Colorants; Printing Inks
- Manufacturer: Kimberly-Clark
- Website: https://www.goodnites.com/en-us/ https://www.drynites.com/ https://www.facebook.com/Goodnites/ https://www.kimberly-clark.com/en-us/brands/ingredients/ingredient-library/goodnites-nighttime-underwear-for-girls-sizes--xs-s-or-m-l-xl

Goodnites (formerly Pull-Ups Goodnites; known as DryNites in the United Kingdom and most markets outside of North America) are diapers designed for managing bedwetting. Goodnites are produced by Kimberly-Clark. The product has also been seen titled as Huggies Goodnites on official Huggies branded webpages.

Goodnites constitute the middle level of Kimberly-Clark's line of disposable products, being targeted at children, teenagers and young adults. The company also produces Huggies diapers for babies, Huggies Pull-Ups training pants for toddlers undergoing toilet training, Poise pads for adult women, and Depend incontinence products for adults in general.

== History ==
=== 1990s ===
- 1994 - Goodnites released
  - The original Goodnites were released in 1994.
    - They came in two sizes: medium (45-65 lbs) and large (65-85 lbs).
- 1999 - Goodnites released a new size
  - In 1999, Kimberly-Clark introduced a new extra-large size (85 lbs-125 lbs and up).

=== 2000s ===
- 2001
  - A "Cloth-Like Cover" replaced the previous cover.
- 2003 - Goodnites introduce a new fit
  - Kimberly-Clark introduced the "Trim-Fit" style (a drastic reduction in padding thickness and the overall size of the pull-up).
- 2004 - Goodnites introduces gender-specific
  - Prior to 2004, Goodnites were unisex, plain-white pull-ups with only a faux tag printed on the back.
  - Kimberly-Clark introduced gender-specific Goodnites with absorbency zoned for boys and girls.
    - Medium Goodnites became small/medium and were designed to fit kids 38-65 pounds.
      - The small/medium size is the equivalent of size 4-8 underwear (Size 8 US is 23.5in Waist).
    - Large and extra large Goodnites were combined into large/extra-Large for kids from 60-125+ pounds (Height for healthy weight of 125 pounds is 4' 11" up to 5' 8" (The CDC states that the Average Height for Men is 69in or 5' 9" with an average waist size of 40.3in while the Average for Women is 63.6in or 5' 3.6" with the average waist size of 38.7in)).
      - The large/extra-large size is equivalent to size 8-14 underwear (Size 14 US is 27in Waist).
- 2007 - Boxer and Sleep Shorts
  - Goodnites brand releases the boxers and sleep shorts

=== 2010s ===
- 2011
  - Goodnites boxers and sleep shorts disappeared from the official website
- 2012 - Bed Mats introduced
  - Goodnites released the bed mats product
- 2014
  - Goodnites Tru-fit were released
- 2017 - Goodnites release a new size
  - A new extra-small size was introduced for both boys and girls. It fits clothing sizes 3-5 and is designed for children weighing 28-45 lbs.
- 2019 - Logo style updates and new products
  - Goodnites has updated the logo online and is stating "New Look, Coming Soon The same protection you trust, with brand new packaging!"
  - Goodnites Tru-fit was discontinued
  - Goodnites introduced the absorbent inserts

=== 2020s ===
- 2021 - Goodnites released new sizes
  - In early 2021, Kimberly-Clark adjusted the sizing of Goodnites and introduced a new extra-large size, intended for those with kids' underwear size 14 to 20 as well as adult sizes up to a 6 waist (corresponding to up to a 30 inches (76 cm) waist) and weight from 95–140 pounds or more (43-63+ kilograms), which are partially aimed toward teenagers and young adults.
  - Extra-small now ranges from 28-43 pounds (13-20 kilograms) and small/medium at 43-68 pounds (20-31 kilograms), or underwear size 4 to 8.
  - The previous large/extra-large size was downgraded to large and revised to be recommended for underwear sized 8 to 12 or weighing 68-95 pounds (31-43 kilograms).
- 2023
  - Goodnites absorbent inserts are not mentioned as a product from the Goodnites brand
  - The Goodnites website added a section for articles focusing on ADHD and Autism when it comes to bedwetting as well as the Goodnites brand has teamed up with the Autism Society of America
  - According to the Kimberly-Clark website, Goodnites became the, "...winner in Good Housekeeping's 2023 Best Parenting Awards in the Diapering Dynamos category."
- 2024
  - The Goodnites logo has changed a little. Instead of the word "goodnites" in a form of cursive being formed by stars, the word is now a solid line with the same lowercase cursive as before.
- 2025
  - Goodnites released a new larger size, XXL, that is meant for those ranging from 120-165 pounds (lbs). The XL size recommendation is revised downward to 96-120 pounds.

== Effectiveness ==
=== Absorbency ===
Goodnites are advertised as absorbing up to 24 US fluid ounces (710 mL) of urine using a combination of wood pulp and superabsorbent polymer.

=== On social behavior ===
In a study published in the Bulletin of Pediatric Health, Goodnites and similar bedwetting underpants were analyzed for effectiveness in relieving social anxiety related to bedwetting for boys ages 7 to 13 and for girls ages 5 to 15. Nearly five-hundred boys who wore diapers on a nightly-basis were compared to a control group experiencing the same problem but did not wear diapers to bed. 625 girls who wore diapers on a nightly-basis were compared to a control group experiencing the same problem but did not wear diapers to bed. The study found, predictably, that nearly all of the children were fearful of being discovered by their peers, while 48% of the 7-to-10-year-olds and 81% of the 11-to-13-year-olds described Goodnites, in particular, being "a little" or "very babyish." Despite these statistics, 60% said they would not go to bed without them. Asked about what they feared upon "discovery," the top worries were verbal teasing (89%) and loss of friends (61%) followed closely by physical bullying (57%), and being compared to a baby (51%). Actual incidences of bullying due to bedwetting were found to be higher among the wearers than in the control, leading the study's author to conclude that Goodnites and similar products did successfully add to the wearers' confidence, so that they engaged more in what was dubbed for the purposes of the study "risky behavior" (e.g. going to sleepovers, participation in camping trips); 17% of the experimental group reported bullying, while only 11% of the control reported bullying.

== Current Products ==
=== Goodnites Nighttime Underwear ===
Goodnites are designed to be worn to bed in order to prevent wetting of the sheets and pajamas in case of an accident. Goodnites are pull-up style rather than tab-style to make it easier for the wearer to change their own pant and to reduce the chance of stigma associated with having to wear diapers by making the experience more similar to wearing actual underwear.

=== Goodnites Bed Mats ===
Goodnites released Goodnites Bed Mats in April 2012. They can be used to protect the mattress from bedwetting accidents, and are designed for occasional episodes of bedwetting. Goodnites Bed Mats feature adhesive to allow them to stick to the bed.

== Discontinued Products ==
=== Boxers & Sleep Shorts ===
Goodnites Boxers (for boys) and Sleep Shorts (for girls) were a product manufactured by Kimberly-Clark from 2007–2009, and distributed from 2007–2010. They were designed to look and feel like boxers. They were blue for boys and pink for girls. The outer covering was cloth-like to look like a pair of boxers. The inside was a diaper.

As of 2011, Kimberly-Clark makes no reference to this product line on the official Goodnites website.

=== Tru-Fit ===
The Tru-Fit line was a pad-and-pants system that combined an absorbent, disposable liner inside a rubberized, waterproof pair of boxer shorts. They came in 4 styles. Likely released in 2014 and then discontinued in 2019 according to the company Facebook page stating, "Our GoodNites Tru-Fit underwear have been discontinued, however, you may be able to find the Tru-Fit underwear through online retailers until inventories are depleted."

=== Goodnites Inserts ===
In 2019, Goodnites introduced inserts for boys who experience minor leakage while sleeping. They fit inside underwear briefs and are one size fits most. They are not recommended for heavy to complete loss of bladder control or for full bedwetting accidents. In 2021, inserts for girls were introduced with similar functionality. They fit inside a standard girls' underwear brief.

As of 2025, the official Goodnites website (owned by Kimberly-Clark) makes no mention of the product.

== Competition ==
When they were first released, Goodnites were an alternative to waterproof mattress pads and more expensive disposable youth diapers intended for children with disabilities; as a result, they lacked any direct competition. By 2000, Goodnites' primary competition consisted of store brand disposable bedwetting diapers. In 2002, Procter & Gamble, Kimberly-Clark's primary competitor, introduced Luvs Sleepdrys as a direct competitor to Goodnites. Luvs Sleepdrys were discontinued in 2004, and, from 2004 to 2008, store brands were the primary form of direct competition to Goodnites. In 2008, Procter & Gamble released Pampers Underjams as another direct competitor to Goodnites. In 2020, Procter & Gamble discontinued Pampers Underjams and replaced them with Ninjamas. As of 2023, Goodnites' competition comes from both Ninjamas and store brand pull-ups or diapers.
