= 2026 Kimberly-Clark distribution center fire =

Warehouse fire in California, US

Coordinates: 33.986°N 117.601°W

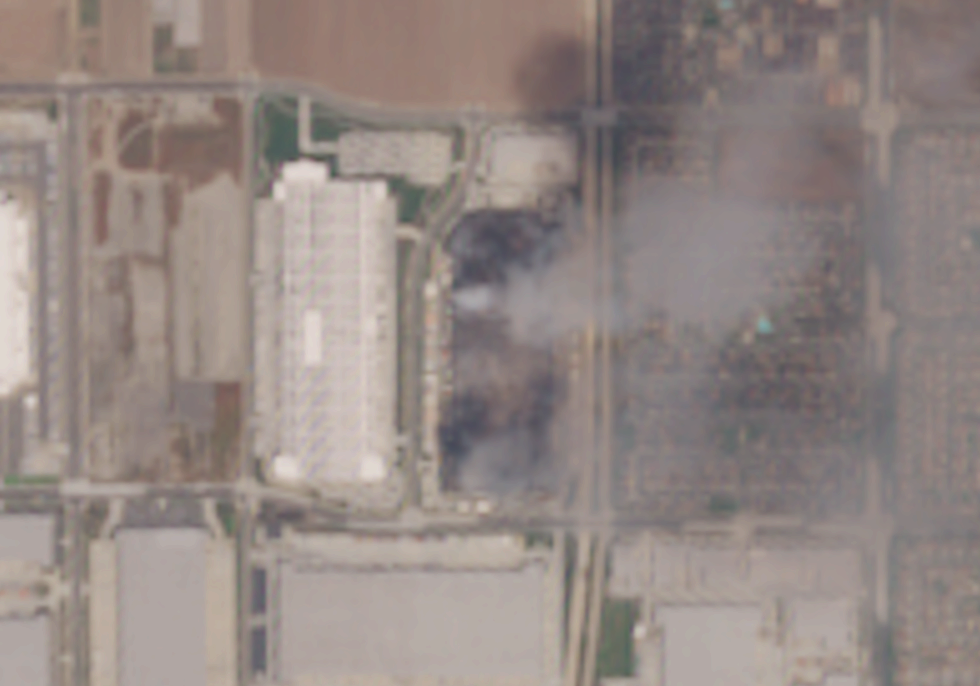
- Satellite image of the burnt warehouse
- Date: April 7, 2026
- Location: Ontario, California, US
- Cause: Arson (suspected)
- Motive: Anti-capitalism
- Deaths: 0
- Injuries: 0
- Property damage: $600 million
- Arrests: 1

On the morning of April 7, 2026, a fire was started at a warehouse in Ontario, California, United States, that served as a distribution center for Kimberly-Clark paper products. It escalated to a six-alarm fire and took nearly twelve hours to extinguish. The facility was completely destroyed and declared a "total loss". There were no injuries or deaths. An employee who was working in the warehouse is accused of arson. Authorities believe he was motivated by anti-capitalist sentiment, including frustration over his pay and working conditions.

== Background ==
Kimberly-Clark is an American multinational corporation that produces paper-based consumer products including Kleenex, Kotex and Andrex. The company was founded in Neenah, Wisconsin, and is headquartered in Irving, Texas. The distribution center involved in the fire was located near Eucalyptus and South Hellman in Ontario, California. It was leased by Kimberly-Clark, who contracted out operations at the facility to NFI Industries, a third-party logistics company. The facility was 1.2 million square feet (0.11 million square metres).

== Fire ==
The fire was first reported at 12:30 a.m. to the Ontario Fire Department. With around 175 firefighters responding, about 20 employees were evacuated. It took nearly twelve hours to extinguish the massive six-alarm fire, which spread rapidly through the building.

A video posted on Facebook showed a person saying "all you had to do was pay us enough to live", then "there goes your inventory" while lighting pallets of paper products ablaze, which were later identified as Scott-brand toilet paper.

The warehouse's roof caved in and the building was deemed a total loss. There were no injuries or deaths. The fire, according to prosecutors, caused property damage amounting to $600 million.

== Criminal proceedings ==
An employee of NFI Industries was arrested and charged by federal and state prosecutors with arson and related crimes. The employee was apprehended about 2 miles (3.2 km) from the warehouse after he had texted an acquaintance to "say goodbye." Body-worn camera footage shows the employee said "I'm confessing" after being asked whether he worked at the warehouse.

Authorities stated that the employee had shared videos of himself starting the fire on Facebook, and according to court documents, he declaimed capitalism and compared himself to Luigi Mangione. Federal attorney Bill Essayli asserted that after the fire, the suspect sent a text message to a coworker that read, "All you had to do was pay us enough to live. Pay more of the value WE bring. Not corporate. Don’t see the shareholders picking up a shift." Essayli declared at a press conference:

Look, America is founded on free enterprise and capitalism[. ...] Anyone who attacks our values, our way of life, our system, which provides the best goods and services to the most people, we're gonna come after aggressively.

The suspect pled not guilty at his first court appearance.

== Impact ==
The warehouse building was estimated to be worth $156 million. According to a Bloomberg Intelligence analyst, loss of the warehouse could impact 3% of sales in the West Coast region.

== See also ==
- Propaganda of the deed
