= Cottonelle =

American brand of toilet paper

Cottonelle toilet paper

Cottonelle is an American brand of toilet paper produced by Kimberly-Clark. It was introduced in 1972.The company has made several different toilet paper types such as regular, Cottonelle Double, (Two-ply) Cottonelle Ultra, Cottonelle Aloe & E, Cottonelle Kids, and Cottonelle Extra Strength, and are currently sold in the United States and Australia under the Kleenex brand.

== Marketing ==
Cottonelle's mascot was originally a woman. At the time, the commercials usually consisted of how soft the roll was by showing a cotton ball and comparing it to the product itself. The mascot of the brand is a Labrador Retriever puppy.

In early 2008, Cottonelle devised an extensive advertising campaign featuring a large "Comfort Haven Bus" decorated to resemble a dog. According to Ad Rants, the bus would travel cross-country to "offer visitors access to "relaxation stations" where people can see first-hand—and hopefully in privacy—how soft and comforting Cottonelle can be."

At one point, Cottonelle featured a program called Puppy Points. On a package of Cottonelle toilet paper would be a label with a certain number of points. The label had to be cut off and saved. The Cottonelle website, showed a list of Cottonelle related items that you could receive in exchange for puppy points, including a Cottonelle bath robe, a Cottonelle picture frame, hand bag, slippers, etc. On July 31, 2008, puppy points were discontinued and could no longer be redeemed for merchandise.

Cottonelle is marketed as Andrex in the UK and Republic of Ireland, and as Baby Soft in South Africa. In Italy is marketed as Scottonelle, previously known as Cottonelle. In 1996, the product had to be renamed as Scottonelle, because Cottonelle was judged to be misleading by an EU commission, as consumers may have thought that the product contains cotton, although it does not. The company then launched a public competition for choosing the new name for the product (which is a subproduct of the Scottex brand); the winner could win a batch of products.
