= Facial tissue =

Disposable paper used on the face

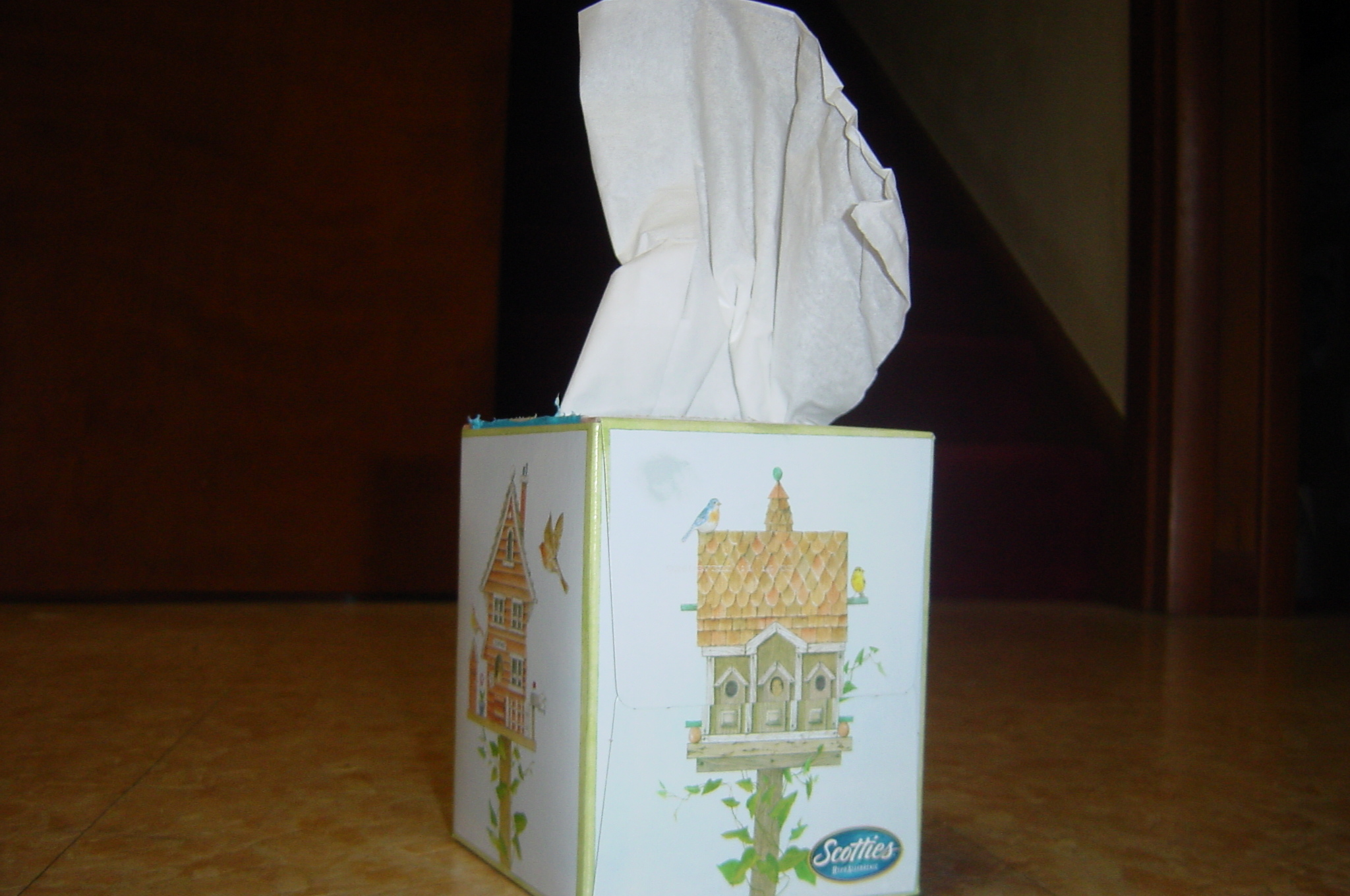
A box containing tissues, with one protruding from it.

Facial tissue and paper handkerchief refers to a class of soft, absorbent, disposable papers that are intended for using on the face. They are disposable alternatives for cloth handkerchiefs. These terms are frequently used to describe the category of paper tissue, usually sold in boxes, designed to facilitate the expulsion of nasal mucus from the nose (nose-blowing), although it may refer to other types of facial tissues such as napkins and wipes.

Facial tissues are commonly referred to as "tissues", or (in Canada and the United States) by the generic trademark "Kleenex", which popularized the invention and its usage outside of Japan.

== Manufacture ==
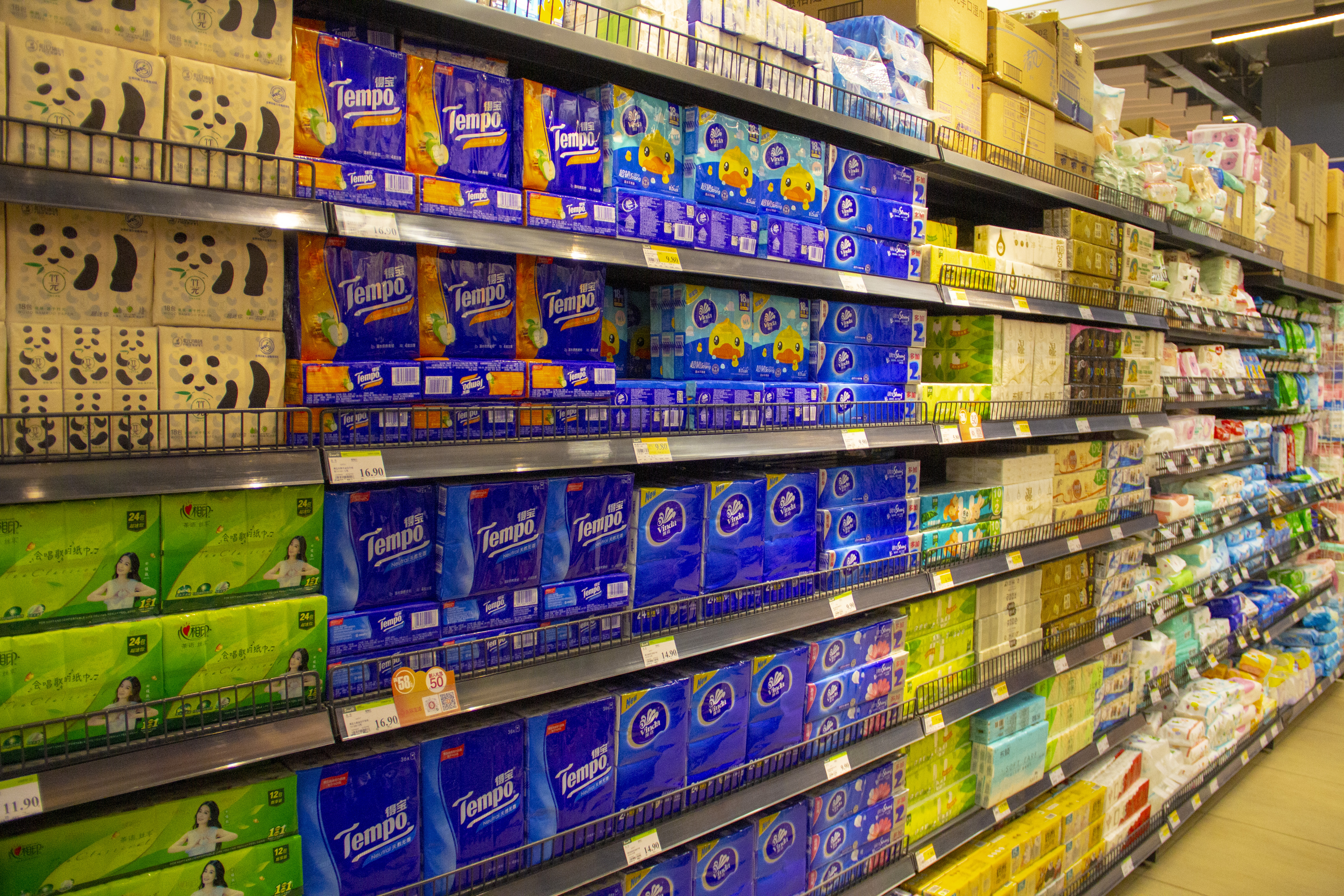
Boxes of facial tissues arranged on a shelf for sale.

Facial tissue and paper handkerchiefs are made from the lowest basis weights tissue paper (14–18 g/m^{2}). The surface is often made smoother by light calendering. These paper types consist usually of 2–3 plies. Because of high quality requirements the base tissue is normally made entirely from pure chemical pulp, but might contain added selected recycled fiber. The tissue paper might be treated with softeners, lotions or added perfume to get the right properties or "feeling". The finished facial tissues or handkerchiefs are folded and put in pocket-size packages or a box dispenser.

Facial tissue may contain non-biodegradable additives for strength.

== History ==
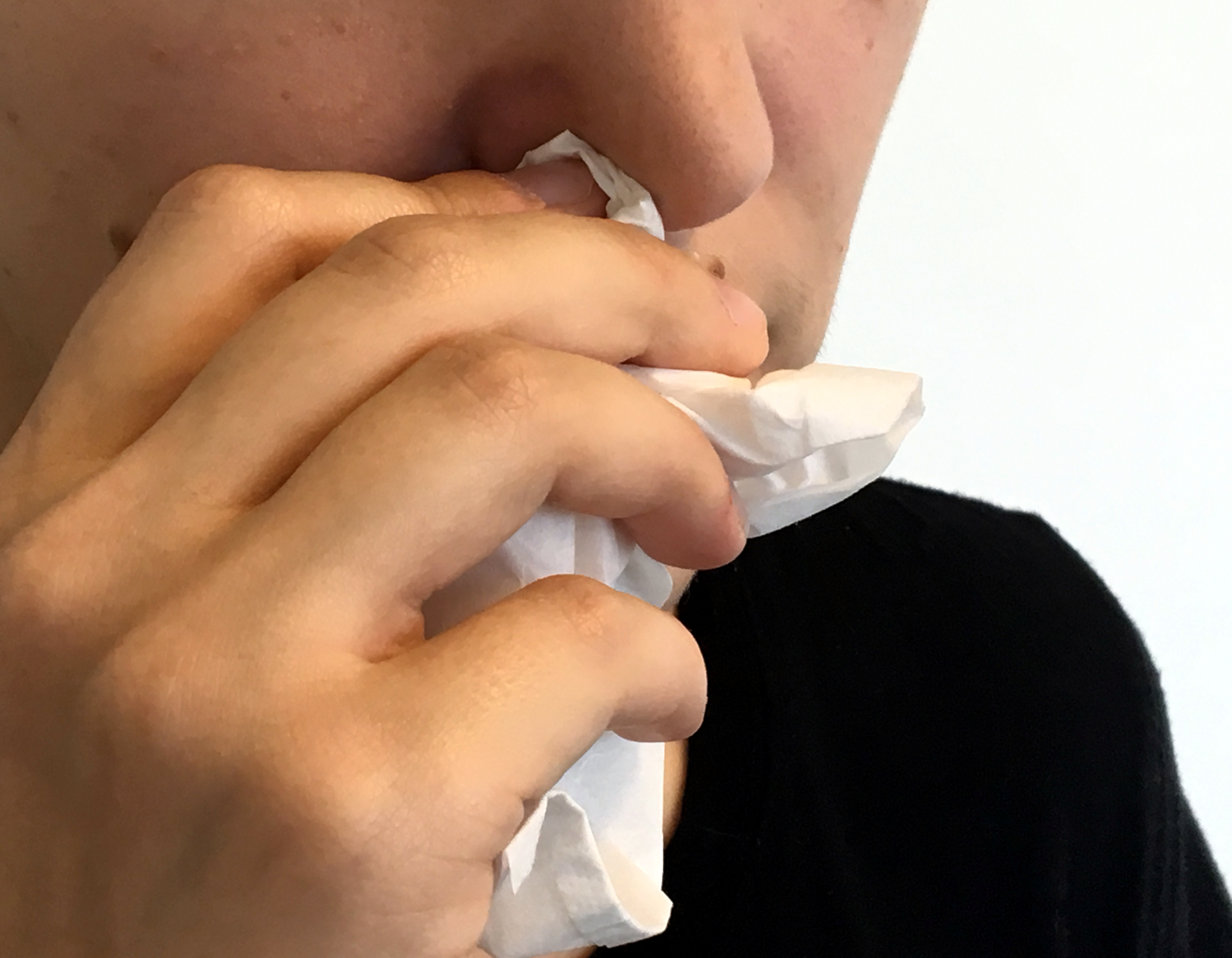
A person holding a tissue to their nose.

Facial tissue has been used for centuries in Japan, in the form of washi (和紙) or Japanese tissue, as described in this 17th-century European account of the voyage of Hasekura Tsunenaga:

"They blow their noses in soft silky papers the size of a hand, which they never use twice, so that they throw them on the ground after usage, and they were delighted to see people around them precipitate themselves to pick them up."

In 1924, facial tissues as they are known today were first introduced by Kimberly-Clark as Kleenex. It was invented as a means to remove cold cream. Early advertisements linked Kleenex to Hollywood makeup departments and sometimes included endorsements from movie stars (Helen Hayes and Jean Harlow) who used Kleenex to remove their theatrical makeup with cold cream. It was the customers that started to use Kleenex as a disposable handkerchief, and a reader review in 1926 by a newspaper in Peoria, Illinois found that 60% of the users used it for blowing their nose. The other 40% used it for various reasons, including napkins and toilet paper.

Kimberly-Clark also introduced pop-up, colored, printed, pocket, and 3-ply facial tissues.

== Leading global players ==
The leading global players in facial tissue market are:

- Procter & Gamble
- Seventh Generation
- Kimberly-Clark
- Essity
- Asia Pulp and Paper
- Hengan International
- Vinda International
- Georgia-Pacific
- Sofidel Group
- WEPA Group
- Metsa Group
- CMPC Tissue
- Industrie Cartarie Tronchetti (ICT)
- Kruger
- Cascades
- C&S Paper
- Sallettalen y Briand s.l (sbpapel)

== Notable brands in the United States ==
- Puffs
- Kleenex
- Scotties
- Seventh Generation
- Fiora
- Nice 'N Soft
- Marcal
- Green Forest

== Notable brands outside the United States ==
- Tempo (handkerchief brand)
- Renova (brand)
