= GDiapers =

Brand of hybrid diapers

gDiapers is a brand of diaper made by the company of the same name. Users can choose to use either a cloth insert or a disposable insert that can be flushed or composted. Co-founders are Jason and Kimberley Graham-Nye. gDiapers began being sold in 2004. gDiapers are licensed from Kuver Designs Pty Ltd, Tasmania, "Eenee designs" diapers.

== Company history ==
gDiapers was founded in 2004 by Australian couple Jason and Kim Graham-Nye when they discovered they would be having a child, and they began looking for an alternative diaper option to reduce the environmental impact of disposable diapers. According to co-founder Jason Graham-Nye, the goal was to create "the world's first hybrid diaper, essentially the best of cloth and disposable" (diapers).

== Design ==
gDiapers gPants are available in a variety of colors and limited-edition prints, some with coordinating tops. gDiapers can also be used with a cloth diaper insert, instead of the disposable insert. The company offers their own reusable cloth insert, though many other options from various sources (including standard infant size prefold diapers) can be used. gDiapers also offers flushable liners called Cloth Liners to lay on top of cloth diaper inserts, facilitating feces disposal.

In addition to the gPants diaper covers, flushable Disposable Inserts, Cloth Inserts, and Cloth Liners, the expanded product line now includes disposable wipes ("Gentle Wipes"). Replacement snap-in pouches are available separately in 6-packs. Bundled packs of gPants and Disposable Inserts are available through the manufacturer and select retailers in the United States and Canada.

== Materials ==
Being a variation of a diaper, the gDiaper design consists of 92% cotton/8% spandex machine-washable outer "gPants," a machine-washable, Water resistant snap-in pouch, and an absorbent inner pad. For absorbency either reusable cloth (gDiapers' Cloth Insert or other options) or a flushable, compostable (wet-only) Disposable Insert can be used. The disposable insert contents include chlorine-free farmed tree fluff pulp and sodium polyacrylate. When ready to dispose of the disposable insert, the user tears along the perforation to allow the fluff mixture contents to be emptied into a toilet before dropping in the outer teabag-like containment, stirs the contents to encourage it to break up, then flushes the insert. The wet-only Disposable Inserts can alternatively be home composted; inserts with fecal material should be flushed or disposed of through standard waste collection. The outer pant features back closure to prevent infants and toddlers from removing the diaper themselves.

== FTC investigation ==
In January 2014, the Federal Trade Commission issued a complaint that gDiapers was using deceptive claims to market their products as environmentally friendly. The complaint determined terminology such as biodegradable, compostable, eco-friendly, green, and non-plastic were misleading consumers with false representations and marketing of gDiaper products. gDiapers later reached a settlement with the FTC, agreeing to change its marketing of gDiaper products to adhere to the policies of the FTC's Green guides.

== Certification ==
gDiapers has received the Cradle to Cradle Design Certification Award, through William McDonough and McDonough Braungart Design Chemistry (MBDC). Cradle to Cradle Certification only covers the Disposable Insert and not the entire diaper product.

== See also ==
- UnderJams
