= Irving Tissue =

Tissue products company

Coordinates: 46°06′29″N 64°43′03″W

Irving Tissue Company Ltd.
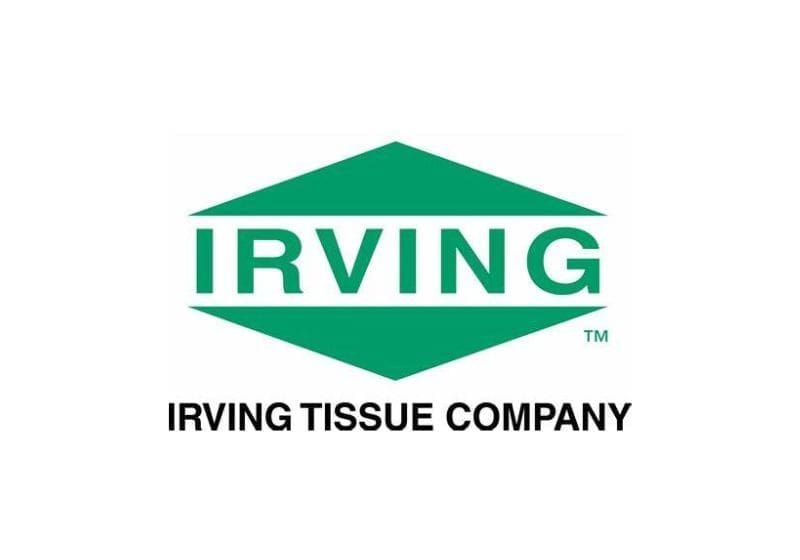
- Type: Subsidiary
- Industry: Pulp and paper
- Founded: 1988; 38 years ago, in Saint John, New Brunswick, Canada
- Products: Tissue paper
- Brands: Majesta; Royale; Scotties (United States only)
- Revenue: 757,5 millions $ (2024)
- Number of employees: 3 089 (2024)
- Parent: J.D. Irving Limited
- Website: irvingtissue.ca

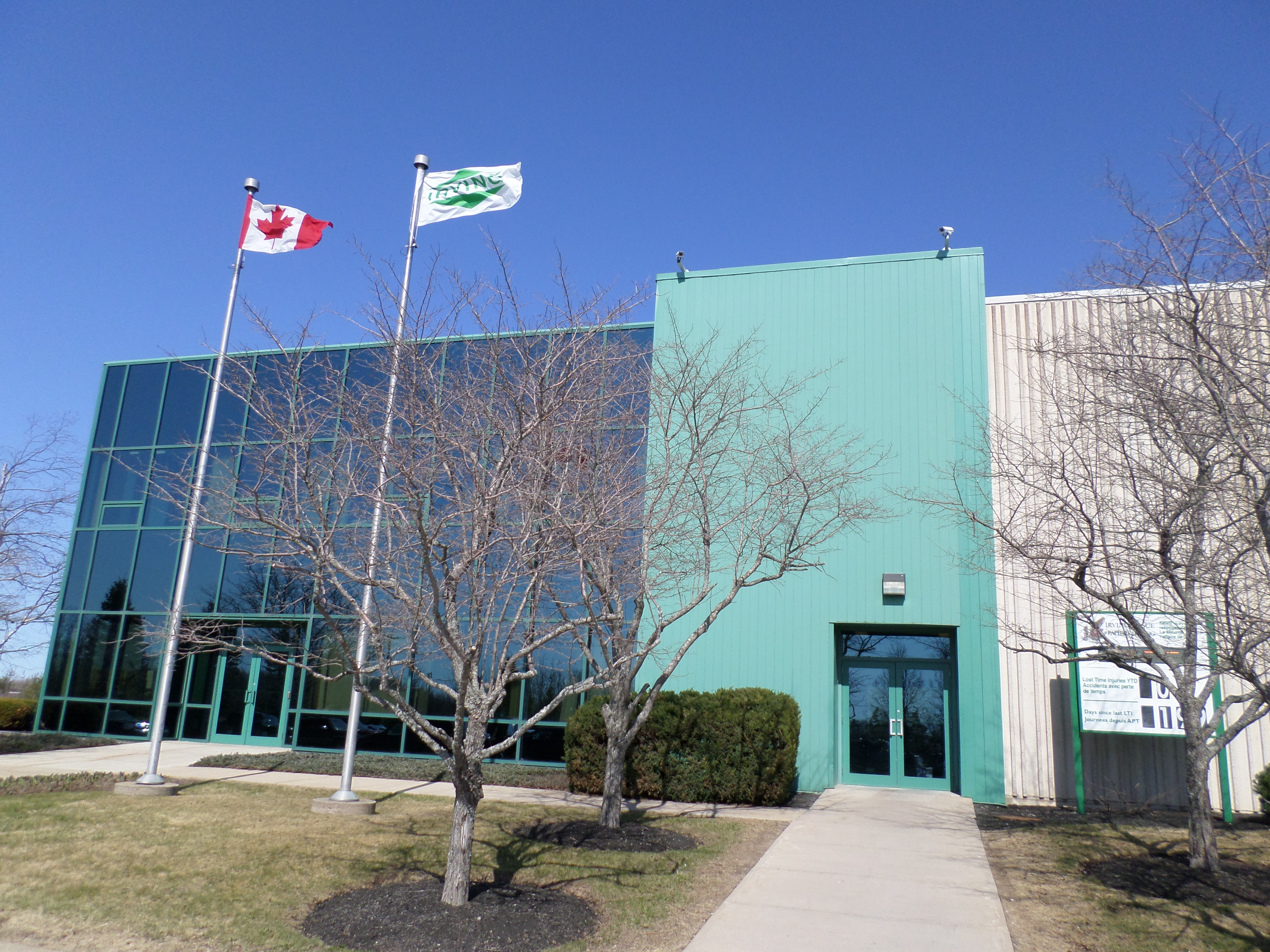
Irving tissue plant in Dieppe

Irving Tissue Company Limited is a tissue products producing company, owned by J.D. Irving Limited. It has manufacturing locations in both Canada and the United States.

== History ==
Irving Tissue was started in 1988 in Saint John, New Brunswick after J.D. Irving acquired a tissue paper mill from Kimberly-Clark in the city's west side (adjacent to Irving Pulp and Paper). Irving began producing tissue for a new subsidiary that was located in Moncton, N.B. and was sold under the marketing name Majesta.

In 1990, J.D. Irving opened a tissue converting plant for Majesta in Dieppe, New Brunswick that would make use of the tissue produced in Saint John. Irving began producing private label tissue products and the Majesta brand was launched in Canada.

In 1996, Irving acquired another tissue paper mill from Kimberly-Clark as well as a tissue converting plant, both located in Fort Edward, New York. Part of this acquisition saw Irving Tissue receive the right to market its products under the Scotties Facial Tissue brand in the United States.

In 2001, J.D. Irving acquired a tissue production and converting plant in Toronto from Procter & Gamble. This acquisition saw Irving Tissue receive the right to market the Royale brand in Canada.

In 2004, Irving Personal Care opened a New Brunswick plant to produce private label baby diapers and training pants for major North American retailers.

In 2010, major investments in buildings and a new through air dried paper machine at the Irving Tissue site in Fort Edward increased capacity and improved product quality.

In 2019, Irving opened a new tissue mill and converting facility in Macon, Georgia. This facility uses the through air dried paper technology to produce bathroom tissue and paper towels.

Currently, Irving Tissue manufactures products under the Majesta and Royale brands in Canada and the Scotties brand in the United States. (Another Canadian company, Kruger Inc., owns the Canadian rights to the Scotties brand.)
