= Andrex =

British toilet tissue brand

- Product type: Toilet paper
- Current owner: Kimberly-Clark
- Country: United Kingdom
- Introduced: 1942; 84 years ago
- Markets: United Kingdom, Hong Kong
- Previous owners: St Andrew Mills; Bowater-Scott
- Registered as a trademark in: European Union
- Website: andrex.co.uk

The Andrex Puppy, seen here in a British advertisement from 1994.

Andrex is a British brand of toilet roll. It is owned by the American multinational corporation Kimberly-Clark. The "Andrex Puppy", a Labrador Retriever puppy that appears on the company's television advertisements, is the mascot and synonymous with the brand.

The brand Andrex is also used by Kimberly-Clark in the Hong Kong market, with products from their Taiwanese factories (though wet wipes are imported from South Korea), along with the brands Scott, Kleenex and Scotties.

Its sister brand in the US and Australia is Kleenex Cottonelle. In Austria it is called "Hakle," and in Germany simply Cottonelle. In the Netherlands, Andrex is known as Page. In Belgium, Italy, Spain and Portugal it is branded as Scottex. In South Africa, it is branded as Baby Soft.

In Australia, the puppy is known as the "Kleenex Puppy" and Kleenex is a partner and supporter of Guide Dogs Australia.

== History ==
Andrex was originally developed in 1942 by paper manufacturer St Andrew Mills Ltd., as a disposable handkerchief. Harrods department store in London sold the handkerchiefs exclusively. Before Andrex, brands such as Bronco and Izal produced products that were harsher. They were mainly sold through chemists and known as "shinies".

The name Andrex comes from St Andrew Mill, on St Andrews Road in Walthamstow, where the toilet tissue was first made. The concept of two ply luxury paper had been inspired by the facial tissues used by American women, as witnessed by the man who created the name Andrex, Ronald Keith Kent. It was the first two-ply tissue.

St Andrew Mills was taken-over by Bowater in 1955, and in 1956, Bowater formed a joint venture with the Scott Paper Company, Bowater-Scott, that specialized in tissue products, including Andrex.

They are known for having a popular TV ad that features a Labrador Retriever puppy trailing a toilet paper roll through a house. However, the original idea in 1972 was for a young girl to run through a house trailing a roll of Andrex. The television regulators did not approve this as they felt it encouraged children to be wasteful. Bowater-Scott's Marketing Director, Raymond Dinkin decided to use a Labrador puppy instead. Since then there have been 130 different adverts featuring various puppies eponymously known as "the Andrex puppy".

In 1986, Bowater sold Bowater-Scott to Scott Paper, and in 1995, Kimberly-Clark purchased Scott Paper.

Andrex says that it marketed the first moist toilet paper in 1992.

In 2004, Andrex replaced its advertising slogan "Soft, Strong and very very Long", with "Tuggable, Huggable softness", and changed to "Be Kind to Your Behind" in 2008. By 2015, it was using the slogans "Andrex clean" and "How Andrex do you feel?"

In 2022, Andrex announced that they would be adding bowel cancer symptoms to their toilet roll packaging following charity campaigning from journalist, educator and podcast host Deborah James, who later died from the disease in June 2022. Various supermarkets followed suit.

== Operations ==
All Andrex mainstream is made in Northfleet. Factories in Flint and Barrow-in-Furness supplement production on the mainline product, along with the Puppies on a Roll, Aloe Vera and Quilts variations.

== See also ==
- List of fictional dogs
