= Royale (brand) =

Canadian consumer household paper product brand

Royale is a Canadian brand of consumer household paper products such as facial tissue, bathroom tissue, paper towels, and paper napkins. The brand is owned by Canadian paper company Irving Tissue.

== History ==
In 1929, New York-based National Cellulose Company dissolved a relationship with its Canadian distributor and opened its first Canadian office in downtown Toronto. In 1936, Toronto businessman William S. Gibson and a team of investors bought out National Cellulose, and Dominion Cellulose was formed. Dominion Cellulose continued to sell its Facelle tissue in Canada until 1961, when the company was sold to Canadian International Paper Company and was renamed Facelle Company. In 1963, the Facelle Company launched its Royale brand with two products: 3-ply facial tissue, and 2-ply bathroom tissue.

In August 1991 the Royale brand was sold to Procter & Gamble where it remained until 2001 when Irving Tissue purchased P&G's Weston Road plant in Toronto, Ontario, along with the rights to the Royale brand.

== Advertising ==
The Royale brand is represented by the Royale Kittens, two white Persian kittens meant to represent the softness of Royale products. Royale's longest running television ad campaign ran from 1973 to 1984, and featured the Royale Kittens playing on a white shag rug and unwinding rolls of bathroom tissue. Since then, the Kittens have appeared in television, print, and Internet marketing material for Royale. In 2010, an official Facebook community page was created in the name of the Royale Kittens.

Other memorable campaigns include Royale's "The Nose" spot featuring pro hockey player Eddie Shack.
