= Majesta =

Majesta or majestas may refer to:

- Majesta (tissue brand), a brand of Irving Tissue
- Toyota Crown Majesta, a car
- Law of majestas, several ancient Roman laws

== See also ==
- Toyota Majesty, a light commercial vehicle
