= Ecopipo =

Mexican cloth diaper brand

Ecopipo is a Mexican manufacturer of cloth diapers headquartered in Irapuato. Ixchel Anaya Meave started the business while a student in 2009 and subsequently incorporated it with her husband.

Anaya was studying interior design in 2009 when she wanted to buy reusable cloth diapers to save on the cost of disposables and because her son developed a skin reaction to them. Finding none made in Mexico, she designed and made her own with her grandmother's help. She began selling them to friends, and then incorporated Ecopipo with her husband. In 2011 she placed first in the national contest to represent Mexico at the Global Student Entrepreneur Awards.

== Naming ==
The company's name is a combination of "Eco-" for "ecological" and "Pipo", the name of a teddy bear handed down in Anaya's family. The diapers use Velcro instead of safety pins and consist of a waterproof outer layer, a polyester fleece inner layer, and inserts made from bamboo. In addition to being available in different sizes, they stretch to fit the baby. They are produced in a factory in Irapuato and in a subcontracted facility in Xalapa to satisfy export demand.

== Sales ==
Eighty percent of sales are within Mexico, where the company sells through a network of about 300 user-distributors. Most orders are via the internet, and Ecopipo exports to Canada, Peru, Ecuador, Argentina, and the European Union; Anaya's aunt Laura Finnegan, who lives in Northern Ireland, is its European representative. As of July 2017 the company produces approximately 4,000 diapers a month, and as of March 2018, has annual sales of $1.3 million. It is in the top five suppliers of reusable diapers in the United Kingdom. The company has branched out into swimming diapers, training pants, diaper bags, blankets, bibs, and reusable menstrual pads, all of which made up 15% of its sales in 2017.
