= Pampers =

American brand of baby and toddler products

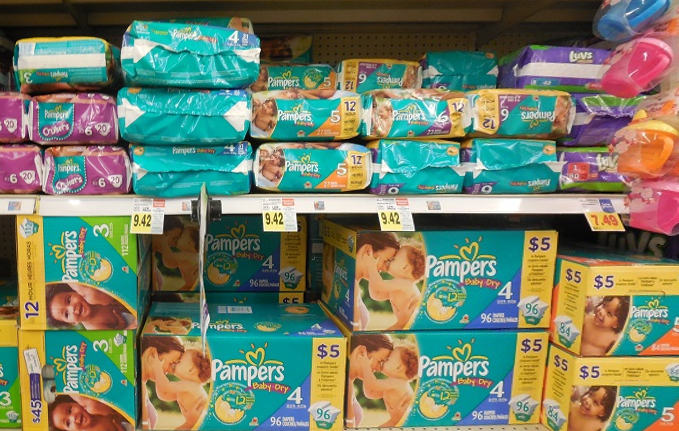
- Pampers products
- Type: Subsidiary
- Founded: 1961; 65 years ago
- Products: Diapers, training underwear, baby wipes
- Owner: Procter & Gamble
- Website: www.pampers.com

Pampers is an American brand that sells baby and toddler products marketed by Procter & Gamble. This includes diapers, wipes etc.

== History ==
In 1961, P&G researcher Victor Mills disliked changing the cloth diapers of his newborn grandchild. He assigned fellow researchers in P&G's Exploratory Division in Miami Valley, Ohio to look into making a better disposable diaper. They were created by researchers at P&G including Vic Mills and Norma Lueders Baker. The name "Pampers" was coined by Alfred Goldman, Creative Director at Benton & Bowles.

In 1971 Pampers filed for a patent for adhesive tabs and release strips on disposable diapers.

In 1982, P&G developed elasticized single and double gussets around the leg and waist areas to aid in fitting and in containing urine or stool which had not been absorbed. In fact, the first patent for the use of double gussets in a diaper was in 1973 by P&G. In 1982, Pampers introduced an elasticized wingfold diaper with elastic leg gathers and refastenable tapes which was a cross between the early 1960s design and the modern hourglass shape, a feature that was first introduced on Luvs in 1976 and evolved into an industry standard in 1985.

In 1986, thin diapers made with absorbent gelling material were released. This made the average weight of a typical medium size diaper decrease by 50%.

In 1987, Pampers and Huggies both introduced frontal tape systems which allow repositioning of the lateral tape without tearing the diaper.

In the 1990s Pampers introduced a thinner diaper known as Ultra Dry Thins. The early 1990s also saw the introduction of gender-specific diapers in the Pampers brand; the product returned to unisex diapers towards the end of the decade.

In 1993, Pampers introduced training underwear, but the Pampers Trainers were a short lived product. Pampers did not sell training underwear again until the introduction of Easy Ups.

In 1996, P&G acquired Baby Fresh wipes from Kimberly-Clark; Kimberly-Clark had recently acquired Baby Fresh owner Scott Paper Company and was ordered to sell the wipes business.

In 1998, Procter & Gamble introduced its largest diaper at the time, Pampers Baby-Dry Size 6. It was promoted in an advertising campaign featuring pediatrician and child development expert Dr. T. Berry Brazelton, who said to let the child decide when the time is right to potty train. The size 6 diapers were billed for growing toddlers. Huggies also introduced a size 6 diaper at this time.

In 2013, Pampers began using the color-changing wetness indicator on their diapers.

In 2018 the company launched its newest diaper line called Pampers Pure which was designed without chlorine bleaching, fragrance, lotion, parabens, natural rubber latex and 26 allergens identified by the European Union. The wipes launched with the new collection contain 99% water and premium cotton. Pampers announced that the goal was to give parents an option for an affordable natural diaper brand.

In 2023, Pampers stopped using licensed designs for their motifs. On their Swaddlers lineup, they began using Shiloh the elephant and Freddy the duck as generic designs.

In 2026, Pampers launched its luxury diapers line, which introduced diapers made with silk fibers in order to lean into luxury and boost sales as birth rate declines.

== Feedback ==
In March 2010, Pampers announced a change to their popular Cruisers and Swaddlers diapers (Active Fit and New Baby respectively in Europe) with the addition of the new Dry-Max technology. Many parents reported rashes and chemical burns as a result of using the new diapers. Procter & Gamble claims that pediatric experts have reviewed the Pampers with DryMax safety data and have seen no correlation between the reported rash and diaper. In May 2010, a lawsuit was filed against Procter & Gamble based on the injuries allegedly caused by the diapers. In September 2010, the United States Consumer Product Safety Commission issued the results of its investigation into the matter, finding no evidence that these diapers cause diaper rash. In the UK the case was brought to people's attention on consumer rights programme Watchdog in May 2010.

== Advertising ==
Pampers is marketed in various ways, such as print ads and television commercials. Print ads often appear in magazines and other periodicals. Television commercials appear during soap operas co-produced by Procter and Gamble, such as Bold and the Beautiful & Young and the Restless, and during the airing of parenting shows. Another way Pampers is promoted is through product placement. Pampers paid $50,000 to be featured in the movie Three Men and a Baby. P&G has also sponsored the program Make Room for Baby on the Discovery Health Channel.

P&G contributes to flood relief efforts in Pakistan in part through its Pampers brand and "Spread a Smile" campaign, which provides free health check-ups, medicines, and oral rehydration therapy to babies and children living in the flood affected areas.

In Romania, Pampers is a sponsor for top tennis player Simona Halep and in Poland, Pampers has a partnership with Eurovision 2024 star Luna.

== Sponsorships ==
- Sesame Street
- Plaza Sésamo
