= UnderJams =

Pull-on style diaper for managing bedwetting

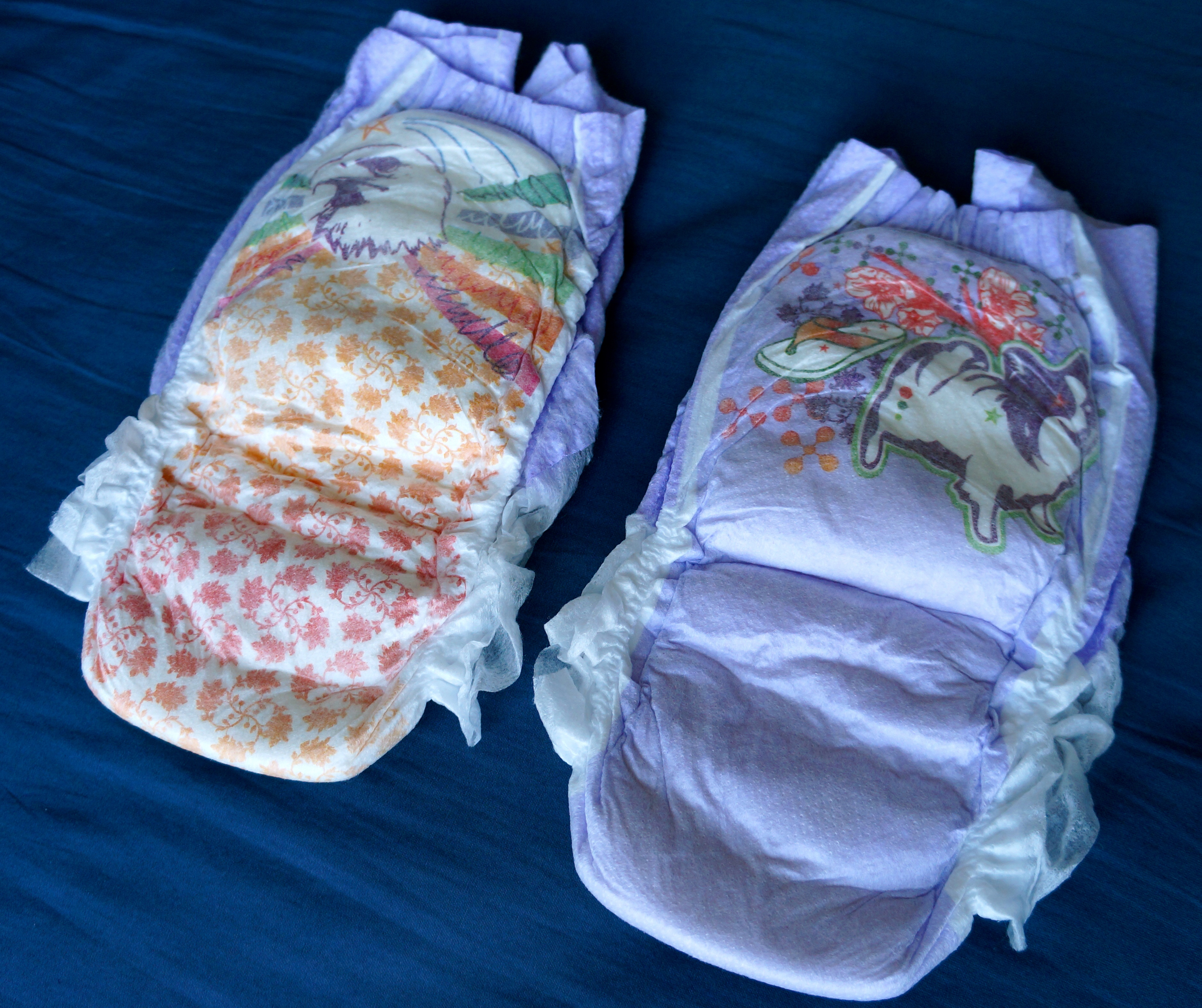
- Girls UnderJams, size L-XL.
- Type: protective clothing
- Website: http://www.pamperssize.com/pampers-underjams-diapers-size/

UnderJams were a pull-on style diaper made by Pampers for managing bedwetting. They were similar to Goodnites. "UnderJams" claimed to be softer and quieter than Goodnites. The package states that they will only fit children up to 85 lbs. Also, because of their low waist, they are hardly visible under pajamas. They were discontinued in 2020 in favor of the new Procter & Gamble product, Ninjamas.

== Origins ==
UnderJams were introduced in 2008 in the US, as a direct competitor to Goodnites.

== Designs ==
For boys, UnderJams initially had a pastel green color, with some assorted designs. For girls, they were a pastel purple color, again with limited designs, as opposed to the Goodnites which are white but have many designs.

Between UnderJams' initial release and UnderJams' discontinuation, the designs for both sexes were updated with more brightly colored designs.

== Sizes ==
Pampers UnderJams came in two sizes; small/medium and large/extra large the weight ranges for which are specified below.

Size	Weight
S\M	38-65 lbs, 17–29 kg
L\XL	58-85 lbs, 26–39 kg
