= Joseph Kruger =

American–Canadian businessman

Joseph A. Kruger (c.1869 – December 21, 1927) was an American–Canadian businessman. He founded Kruger Inc. in 1904, in Montreal, Quebec, Canada. The privately owned pulp and paper industry company continues today, and employs 10,500 people internationally.

Kruger was a paper merchant in New York City around 1900. He moved his family to Montreal, where he founded the family business of producing fine papers. The business grew and was incorporated in 1921. Kruger had a wife, Nettie, and they had two sons, Gene and Bernard, and a daughter, Ruth. The company was passed on to his sons Gene and Bernard when Kruger died in 1927.
