= Darwin Smith =

American industrialist

- Occupation: Corporate executive

Darwin Eatna Smith (1926 – 1995) was CEO of Kimberly-Clark from 1971 to 1991.

== Early life and education ==
Smith graduated from Garrett High School in 1944. He held a bachelor degree from Indiana University Bloomington in 1950 and a law degree from Harvard Law School.

== Honors ==
He was inducted into the Indiana university Kelley School of Business Academy of Fellows in 1978 and received the Indiana University Distinguished Alumni Service Award in 1979.
