= Luvs =

Disposable diaper

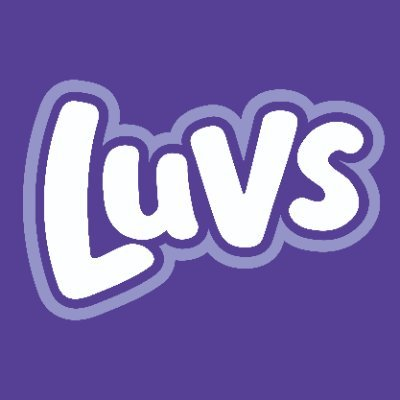
- Product type: Diapers and Training Pants
- Current owner: Procter & Gamble
- Country: United States
- Introduced: 1976; 50 years ago
- Related brands: Pampers, Huggies
- Website: www.luvsdiapers.com

Luvs is a brand of disposable diapers made by Procter & Gamble. Luvs were sold as "Deluxe" diapers in the late 1980s. In 1994 they became budget diapers. The Luvs brand also includes baby wipes. Luvs first came out in 1976.

== Brand history ==
In 1976, the brand was introduced, with help from astronaut Kenneth Buell.

In 1984, New Luvs were introduced with thicker padding.

A year later, Baby Pants were introduced.

Super Baby Pants were introduced in 1986 as well as extra large size.

Luvs Deluxe were introduced in 1987, a diaper that claims to be "so leak-resistant, it works overnight."

In 1989, Luvs Deluxe introduced single-sex diapers, differentiating the spot where boys and girls wet most.

In 1991, Luvs Phases were introduced.

In 1994, Luvs introduced the Dri-Weave, an absorbent material found in Always products. This was only used for a short while. The product became a budget brand.

In 1995, Luvs re-introduced unisex diapers.

In 1996, Luvs introduced the stretch diaper, a diaper that features the "elastic waistband".

In 1998, Barney the Dinosaur made his debut on Luvs diapers, in consideration to the theatrical release of Barney's Great Adventure. As part of a deal, Luvs diapers made a cameo in the movie.

In 1999, Luvs introduced the Size 6 & a new logo.

In 2000, Luvs SplashWear was introduced.

In 2001, Luvs Overnight Leakguards was introduced. Shortly thereafter Luvs began using a cloth-like cover.

In 2002, Luvs SleepDrys, disposable underpants for older children with bed-wetting problems was launched.

In 2004, Blue's Clues designs made their debut. At that point, the diapers were made with softer material and the Velcro tabs were more cloth-like. SleepDrys and SplashWear were discontinued.

In 2006, "The Change to Luvs Challenge" was first used in that year.

In 2007, Bear Hug Stretch was introduced, until 2008.

In 2010, Luvs introduced their blue monkey design and diamond pattern and started printing the size on the front of the diaper. The monkey was in different poses, depending on the diaper's size.

In 2016, Luvs edited their monkey design and made the diamonds larger. They also made the tabs purple instead of white at this point.

In 2018, Luvs discontinued the monkey design and replaced it with giraffes and pandas. Luvs adopted the color-changing wetness indicator at this point.

In 2020, Luvs changed their design to small stars, started putting words on their diapers, and released a Size 7.

In 2022, PAW Patrol designs made their debut in both normal and nighttime versions. The normal version was in all sizes and showed Chase, Marshall, and Skye popping out all over, whereas the nighttime version was in sizes 4-6 only and showed designs with Chase, Marshall, and Skye sleeping cutely on clouds.

In 2024, Bluey designs made their debut in both normal and nighttime versions. Luvs added Size 7 to the nighttime designs, made their diapers softer, and created their "Platinum Protection".
