= Scotties =

Brand of facial tissues

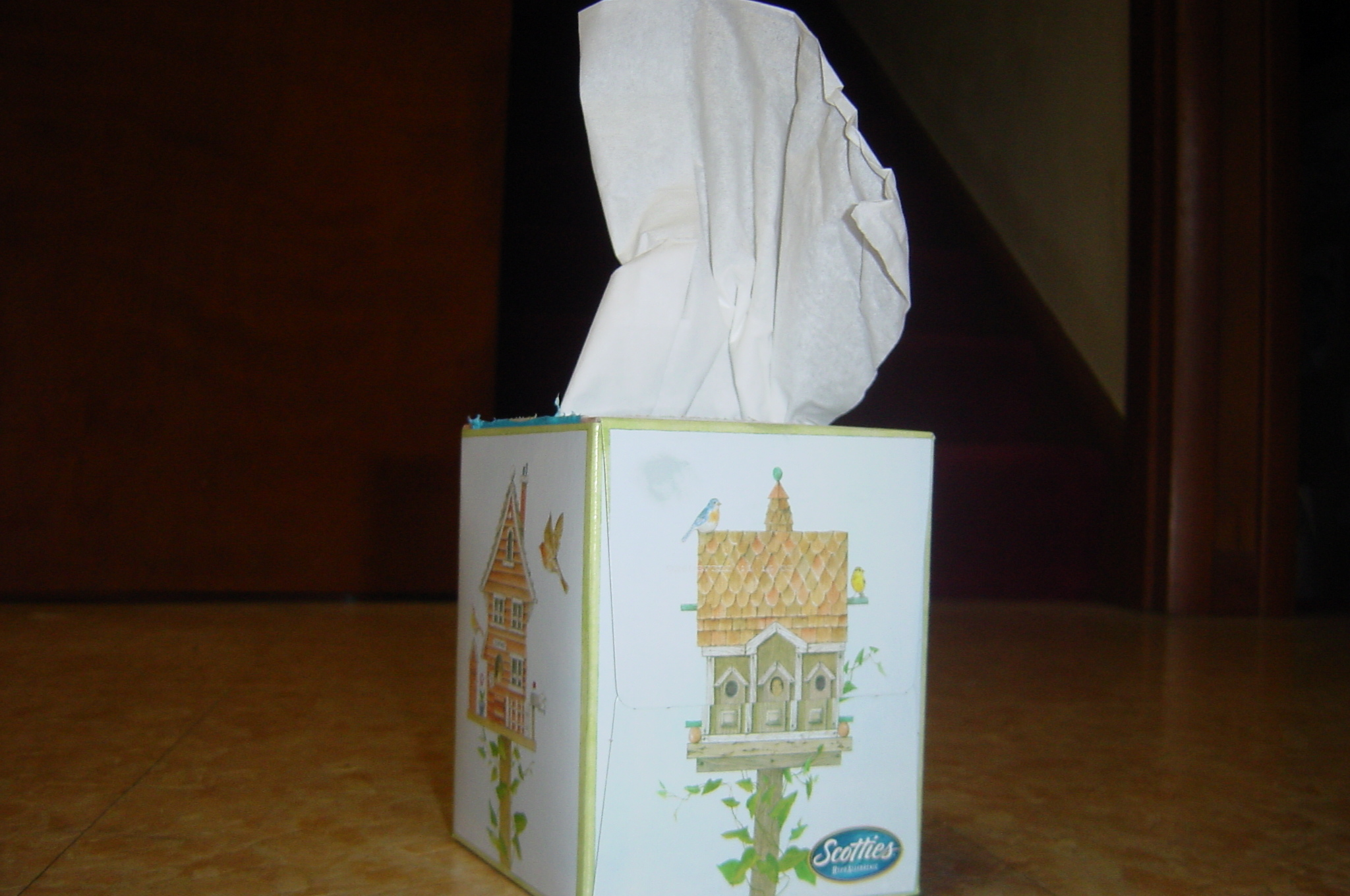
A box of Scotties tissues

Scotties is a facial tissue brand originally owned by the Scott Paper Company, created in 1955.

Kimberly-Clark, owner of the rival Kleenex brand, acquired Scott Paper in 1995. For antitrust reasons Kimberly-Clark was required to divest the Scotties business in the U.S. Kimberly-Clark sold it to Irving Tissue while maintaining control of the Scotties trademark. Kruger Inc. separately acquired Scott's Canadian subsidiary, now known as Kruger Products, which sells Scotties tissues there.

The brand is well known in Canada for its sponsorship of the women's curling championship Scotties Tournament of Hearts, often simply called the Scotties.
