= Depend (undergarment) =

Kimberly-Clark brand of incontinence undergarments

Depend is a Kimberly-Clark brand of adult diapers for people with urinary or fecal incontinence, heavy menstruation, or postpartum discharge. It positions its products as an alternative to typical adult diapers. Depend is the dominant brand of adult diapers in the United States with a 49.4 share of the market.

== History ==
Kimberly-Clark has been making Huggies disposable diapers for infants since 1978. In 1984, the Depend products for adults were introduced.

Depend was originally test marketed as the Conform brand in Green Bay, WI. The original products begun being made in 1983 and were liners, available in regular and extra absorbencies. They could be worn inside underwear or alone, and were held on by small elastic belts. In 1984, Depend Shields were added for slight incontinence in regular and extra absorbencies. These were intended for moderate to heavy bladder incontinence. Beginning in 1985, fitted briefs for heavy to complete bladder incontinence as well as bowel incontinence were added. The briefs were made in youth, small, medium and large. There were various sizes in terms of packaging as well for all three lines of products. The briefs had a green plastic cover while in the undergarments and shields the green plastic was covered with a thin cloth like cover. In 1987, the undergarments were made in both cloth like non-woven covers and plastic covers. The products were sold in large, cardboard boxes initially.

The padding was originally similar to what had been used for disposable baby diapers like Huggies. In 1988, all Depend products began to use an Absorb-Lock core which turns to a gel when wet as baby diapers began using this as well. In 1992, Depend Briefs were made in two different absorbencies, regular and overnight. The sizes were revamped to youth/small, medium and large. In 1998, Depend added Pull Up Adult Disposable Underwear to their offerings. Initially, this was clothlike and had absorbency down in the middle and was not recommended for night-time use. They had two sizes, medium and large. In 2000, Depend Briefs went through a huge change. They began to be made in white with a very slight green tint. They were still made in regular and night-time absorbencies. Sizes remained the same.

In 1998, 3 dimensional pull-on underwear were introduced and these completely replace adult diaper style 'briefs' that had tape tab closures. They offered consumer a product which fit and looked much more like regular underwear. In 2001, refastenable disposable underwear that was pull up style with a tearable area on each side of the brief and tapes to convert to a tape on disposable brief. These were cloth like but had absorbency all the way up the front and all the way in the back with similar protection and absorbency to the fitted brief that was plastic backed. The other Depend Underwear products became more absorbent in 2005. In 2002, the Depend Booster pad was added as a product to add absorbency to any depend product.

That year, the Depend shields were phased out due to their other product, Poise pads, used for slight female incontinence. That year, the male guard was added for minor male incontinence. In 2005, the Depend Briefs were renamed. The regular absorbency continued while the overnight absorbency was now called "Maximum Protection".

The product was originally unisex in style; in March 2009, Depend introduced gender-specific adult underwear in the United States and Canada. Depend Underwear for Men and Depend Underwear for Women replaced the existing unisex adult underwear on store shelves nationwide. Also that year the booster pads and undergarment liners were discontinued. Depend now had the Poise pads, male guards, gender specific disposable underwear, refastenable Underwear that remained unisex, and the fitted brief that was unisex. The fitted brief now had one absorbency and was now called "Maximum Protection". They remained plastic backed while the other products kept the cloth like cover they had always had.

In 2012 the company introduced very slender brief-style products, Silhouette for Women and Real Fit for Men, aimed at the Baby Boomer market. Also, the male guards were changed as well. They now had two absorbencies. One is the shield that is very thin for minor drips and intended for simple protection for continent boys and men that drip after using the bathroom. The Depend Guards for Men have more absorbency and are used for slight to moderate surges. Both are designed for brief style underwear. The Men's Underwear began being offered in grey as well as white and eventually only in grey. The women's underwear is now offered in a light tan as well as black. The refastenable Underwear remained the same since it redesigned in 2005. The Maximum Protection brief became cloth-like in the Spring of 2016 and the tapes were reduced from 6 to 4, though (due to consumer demand) in the Spring of 2017 Depend reverted to the original design. Both the refastenables and Maximum Protection briefs are designed for night-time use; another night-time brief, Night Defense, was introduced in 2016, initially for women who wet the bed, but later introducing the Men's version in 2019. The Men's and Women's underwear with exception of one of the lines of Men's and Women's Underwear are designed for daytime use.

== Advertising ==
For more than 20 years the principal spokesperson for the product was actress June Allyson. The advertising campaign has been hailed as reducing the socially debilitating stigma of incontinence.

In 2012 the company's advertising featured younger celebrities who were not incontinent but agreed to model the Depend brief-style products for charity. Featured celebrities included actress Lisa Rinna, football player Clay Matthews, hockey player P. J. Stock, and figure skater Isabelle Brasseur.

== In popular culture ==
In the 1996 novel Infinite Jest by David Foster Wallace, each year has a corporate sponsor; most of the action takes place in year 8, the "Year of the Depend Adult Undergarment".

In the Homestar Runner game Peasant's Quest, the character Rather Dashing will wish he had "Depeasant adult undergarments" when facing Trogdor the Burninator.

Lisa Rinna's success from the campaign is referenced multiple times on The Real Housewives of Beverly Hills, where Rinna is a cast member.
