= Man of Steel, Woman of Kleenex =

1969 essay in English by Larry Niven about the sexuality of Superman

"Man of Steel, Woman of Kleenex" is a 1969 essay in which science fiction author Larry Niven details the problems that the fictional character Superman would face in sexual intercourse and reproduction with a human woman, using arguments based on humorous reconciliation between physics, biology and the abilities of Kryptonians as presented in Superman comic books.

== Summary ==
The issues discussed include Superman's loss of physical control during intercourse, the presumed "super powers" of Superman's sperm cells, genetic incompatibility between humans and Kryptonians, and the dangers the woman would face during gestation. The title is a reference to the power and invulnerability indicated by Superman's epithet "Man of Steel", contrasting it with the relative fragility – like Kleenex brand facial tissue – of a human. The hypothetical woman is referred to in the essay as "LL", the initials of three women Superman has been romantically involved with: Lois Lane, Lana Lang and Lori Lemaris.

== Publication history ==
The essay was first published in the men's magazine Knight in 1969, then collected in Niven's 1971 collection, All the Myriad Ways. It was republished in the 1978 anthology SuperHeroes edited by Michel Parry and noted with a starburst on the cover: "SPECIAL BONUS FEATURE! Intimate details of Superman's sex life revealed!" It was reprinted in the 1990 Niven compilation N-Space. It was published with softcore illustrations by classic Superman artist Curt Swan, with the character's identifying features and logo obscured, and conspicuous trademark/copyright disclaimers, in a 1995 issue of Penthouse Comix.
