= Kimberly-Clark =

American multinational personal care corporation

Kimberly-Clark Corporation
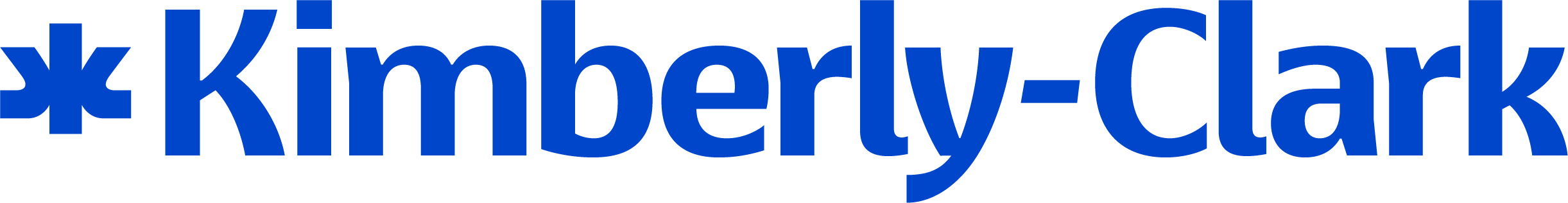
- Type: Public
- Traded as: Nasdaq: KMB; S&P 500 component
- ISIN: US4943681035
- Industry: Consumer goods; Manufacturing; Personal care
- Founded: 1872; 154 years ago, in Neenah, Wisconsin, U.S.
- Founders: John A. Kimberly; Havilah Babcock; Charles B. Clark
- Headquarters: Irving, Texas, U.S. (since 1985)
- Area served: Worldwide
- Key people: Michael D. Hsu (chairman & CEO)
- Products: Kimberly-Clark; Kleenex; Huggies; Kotex; Depend; Scott; Viva; Cottonelle; Andrex; Huggies Pull-Ups; GoodNites; Little Swimmers; Poise; Softex; Neat Sheet
- Revenue: ▼US$20.1 billion (2024)
- Operating income: ▲US$3.21 billion (2024)
- Net income: ▲US$2.55 billion (2024)
- Total assets: ▼US$16.5 billion (2024)
- Total equity: ▼US$840 million (2024)
- Number of employees: 38,000 (2024)
- Subsidiaries: Kenvue
- Website: www.kimberly-clark.com/en-us/

Camelia Populär - sanitary napkin around 1942 from military stocks for nurses

Kimberly-Clark Corporation is an American multinational consumer goods and personal care corporation that produces mostly paper-based consumer products. The company manufactures sanitary paper products and surgical & medical instruments. Kimberly-Clark brand name products include Kleenex facial tissue, Kotex feminine hygiene products, Cottonelle, Scott and Andrex toilet paper, Wypall utility wipes, KimWipes scientific cleaning wipes and Huggies disposable diapers and baby wipes.

Founded in Neenah, Wisconsin, in 1872 and based in the Las Colinas section of Irving, Texas, since 1985, the company operated its own paper mills around the world for decades, but closed the last of those in 2012. With recent annual revenues topping $18 billion per year, Kimberly-Clark is regularly listed among the Fortune 500. As of March 2020, the company had approximately 40,000 employees.

== History ==
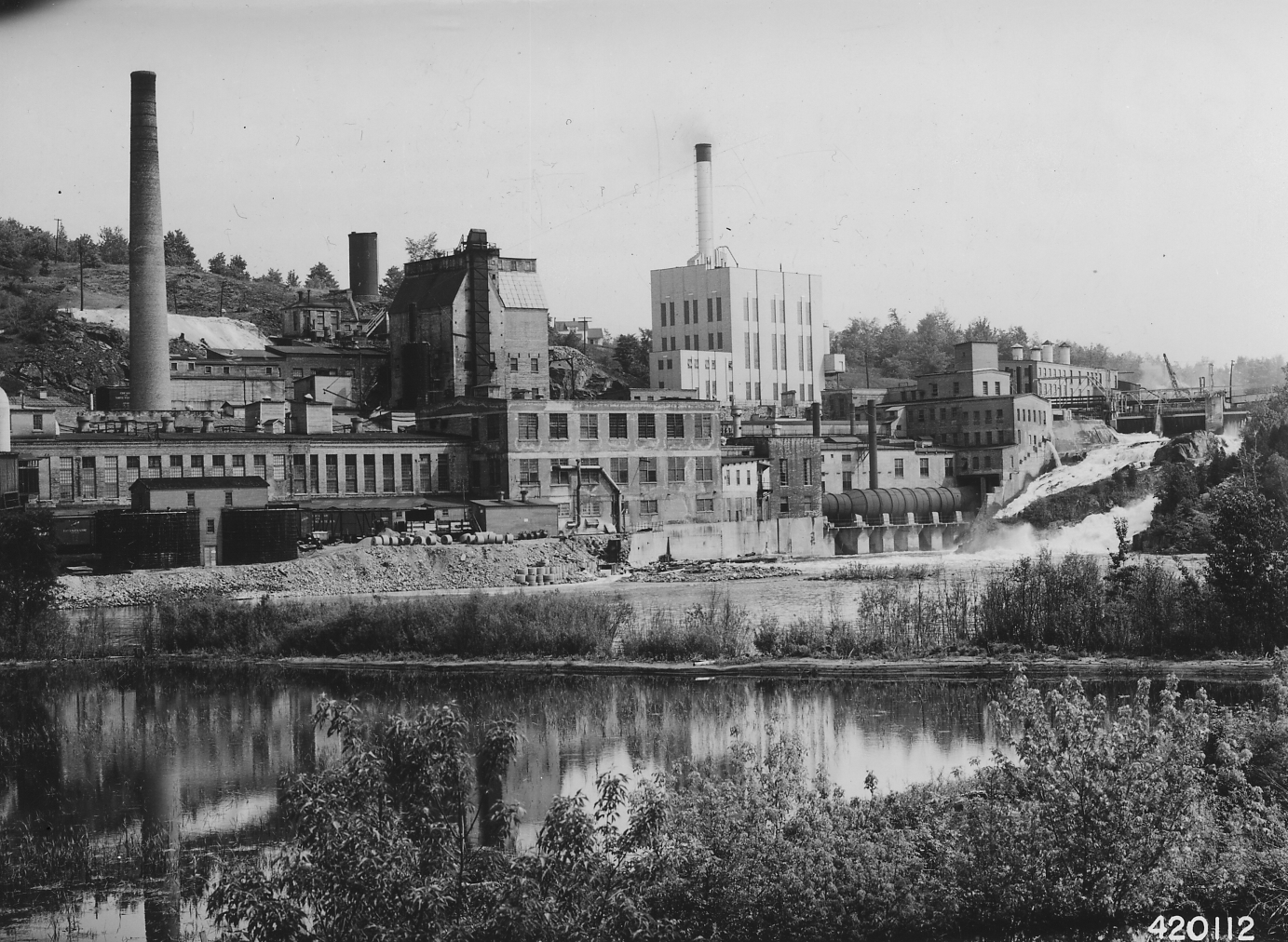
Kimberly-Clark paper mill in Niagara, Wisconsin, 1942.

Kimberly, Clark and Co. was founded in 1872 by John A. Kimberly, Havilah Babcock, Charles B. Clark and Franklyn C. Shattuck in Neenah, Wisconsin, with $42,000 (equivalent to US$1,128,750 in 2025) of capital. The group's first business was operating paper mills, which the collective expanded throughout the following decades. In 1888, the fledgling company faced a significant setback when its groundwood "Atlas" paper mill burned. Through an extensive effort by labor and management, within five months the mill was rebuilt and in production at a greater capacity. In that same year the company began rapid expansion, purchasing land in a town then known as The Cedars for a new groundwood pulp plant designed by paper mill architects D. H. & A. B. Tower. In 1889, the town was renamed Kimberly after John A. Kimberly. The company also contracted the firm to expand its sulphite pulp complex in Appleton, Wisconsin, which allowed it to become the first firm west of Pennsylvania to adopt this improved manufacturing process. The company developed cellu-cotton in 1914, a cotton substitute used by the U.S. Army as surgical cotton during World War I. Army nurses used cellu-cotton pads as disposable sanitary napkins, and six years later the company introduced Kotex, the first disposable feminine hygiene product. Kleenex, a disposable handkerchief, followed in 1924. Kimberly & Clark joined with The New York Times Company in 1926 to build a newsprint mill in Kapuskasing, Ontario, Canada. Two years later, the company went public as Kimberly-Clark.

The firm expanded internationally during the 1950s, opening plants in Mexico, West Germany and the United Kingdom. It began operations in 17 more foreign locations in the 1960s. The company formed Midwest Express Airlines from its corporate flight department in 1984. Kimberly-Clark's headquarters moved from Neenah, Wisconsin to Irving, Texas the following year, although its products are still produced in Neenah. Alongside Cadbury, Kimberly-Clark withdrew advertising support for Lou Grant in 1982, due to pressure from various conservative caucuses campaigning against star Ed Asner. Under the leadership of Darwin Smith as CEO from 1971 to 1991, the company was transformed from a business paper company to a consumer paper products company.

In 1991, Kimberly-Clark and The New York Times Company sold their jointly owned paper mill in Kapuskasing, Ontario. Kimberly-Clark entered a joint venture with Buenos Aires-based Descartables Argentinos S.A. to produce personal care products in Argentina in 1994 and also bought the feminine hygiene unit of VP-Schickedanz (Germany) for $123 million and a 90% stake in Handan Comfort and Beauty Group (China).

Kimberly-Clark merged with Scott Paper in 1995 for $9.4 billion. In 1997, Kimberly-Clark sold its 50% stake in Canada's Scott Paper to forest products company Kruger Inc. and bought diaper operations in Spain and Portugal and disposable surgical masks maker Tecnol Medical Products. Augmenting its presence in Germany, Switzerland and Austria, in 1999 the company paid $365 million for the tissue business of Swiss-based Attisholz Holding. Expanding its offerings of medical products, the company bought Ballard Medical Products in 1999 for $774 million and examination-glove maker Safeskin in 2000 for about $800 million.

Also in 2000, the company bought virtually all of Taiwan's S-K Corporation; the move made Kimberly-Clark one of the largest manufacturers of packaged goods in Taiwan. The company later purchased Taiwan Scott Paper Corporation for about $40 million and merged the two companies, forming Kimberly-Clark Taiwan. In 2001, Kimberly-Clark bought Italian diaper maker Linostar and announced it was closing four Latin American manufacturing plants.

In 2002, Kimberly-Clark purchased paper-packaging rival Amcor's stake in an Australian joint venture. In 2003, Kimberly-Clark added to its global consumer tissue business by acquiring the Polish tissue maker Klucze.

In early 2004, chairman and chief executive officer Thomas Falk began implementation of a global business plan that the company has detailed in July 2003. The firm combined its North American and European groups for personal care and consumer tissue under North Atlantic groups. In 2019, CEO Thomas Falk resigned his position but continued on as the company's chairman of the board. COO Michael D. Hsu became CEO following Falk's retirement.

As of March 2020, the company had approximately 40,000 employees. In April 2020, the Financial Times reported that panic-buying during the COVID-19 pandemic led to a 13 percent increase in sales of Kimberly-Clark's consumer tissues in the first quarter of 2020 compared with the previous year. In April 2020, Kimberly Clark reported an eight percent decline in organic sales, its worst sales performance in at least a decade, according to the Wall Street Journal.

In 2022, Kimberly-Clark acquired majority stake in Thinx, a period underwear brand. Sales declined significantly by 2022 as customers lost the brand's trust regarding the controversy behind the use of PFAS in its products, ending in a class action settlement in 2023. The company eventually recorded an asset impairment for Thinx and Softex Indonesia of $658 million in 2023.

On May 19, 2025, Kimberly-Clark announced that after 41 years, it would transfer its stock from the New York Stock Exchange to the Nasdaq Global Select Market with the changes taking place on May 30 of that year.

In November 2025, Kimberly-Clark announced it would buy Tylenol producer Kenvue for $48.7 billion. The deal would add the Aveeno, Band-Aid, Benadryl, Benylin, Calpol, Carefree, Clean & Clear, Combantrin, Imodium, Listerine, Motrin, Mylanta, Neutrogena, Nicorette, Johnson's Baby, Sudafed, Visine, and Zyrtec brands to the company's portfolio. The acquisition was completed on November 2, 2026.

On April 7, 2026, the Kimberly-Clark Distribution Center in Ontario, California was set on fire and destroyed. This was filmed by the arsonist, who stated in the video, "all you had to do was pay us enough to live," and "there goes your inventory."

== Ownership and subsidiaries ==
Kimberly-Clark shares are mainly held by institutional investors (The Vanguard Group, BlackRock, State Street Corporation, and others). Its subsidiaries include Kimberly-Clark Professional.

=== Midwest Airlines ===
The origin of Midwest Airlines can be traced back to 1948, when Kimberly-Clark opened its corporate flight department and began providing air transportation for company executives and engineers between the company's headquarters in Neenah and its paper mills.

In 1969, K-C Aviation was born from the company's air operations, and was dedicated to the maintenance of corporate aircraft. In 1982, K-C Aviation initiated shuttle flights for Kimberly-Clark employees between Appleton, Memphis, and Atlanta. With this experience, and considering the Airline Deregulation Act of 1978, Kimberly-Clark and K-C Aviation formed a regularly scheduled passenger airline, Midwest Express Airlines, which was started on June 11, 1984. The name of the airline was shortened to Midwest Airlines in 2003.

K-C Aviation divested itself from the airline in 1996. Two years later, Gulfstream Aerospace purchased K-C Aviation from Kimberly-Clark for $250 million, which included its operations at airports in Dallas, Appleton, and Westfield, Massachusetts.

== Major product lines ==
=== Major American consumer product lines ===
Kimberly-Clark produces mostly paper-based consumer products. The company manufactures sanitary paper products and surgical & medical instruments. Kimberly-Clark brand name products include Kleenex facial tissue, Kotex feminine hygiene products, Cottonelle, Scott and Andrex toilet paper, Wypall utility wipes, KimWipes scientific cleaning wipes and Huggies disposable diapers and baby wipes.

==== Diapers and incontinence products ====
- Huggies: diapers for infants and toddlers
- Little Swimmers: swim diapers, marketed under the Huggies brand
- Huggies Pull-Ups: training pants for toddlers undergoing toilet training, marketed under the Huggies brand
- GoodNites (DryNites outside North America): pull-on diapers for children, teens and young adults who experience nocturnal enuresis (bedwetting), spun off from the Pull-Ups brand
- Poise: Pads and liners for light to moderate urinary incontinence in adult women
- Depend: diapers and briefs for adults

==== Feminine hygiene ====
===== Kotex =====
Kotex is a feminine hygiene product line that includes pantiliners, pads and tampons.

==== Tissues and wipes ====
===== Cottonelle =====
Cottonelle is a brand name for bath products. Product forms include premium bath tissue and flushable moist wipe products. In June 2019, the Federal Court of Australia found in favour of Kimberly-Clark Australia in Australian Competition & Consumer Commission's (ACCC) case against them for the claim that Kleenex Cottonelle Flushable Cleansing Cloths were advertised as "flushable" in Australia's sewerage system, in contrast to other similar products which warned consumers against flushing them.

The court said that although they contributed to household sewerage system blockages in an unknown number of instances, even faecal matter and toilet paper contributed to those problems. The ACCC argued unsuccessfully that Kimberly-Clark shouldn't be able to take advantage of the difficulty to isolate individual causes in individual cases, and that it was a significant cause of systematic issues. On October 13, 2020, the Cottonelle brand flushable wipes issued a recall because the products manufactured between February through September 2020 may contain Pluralibacter gergovaie.

===== Kleenex =====
Kleenex is a brand name of facial tissue paper. Many versions have been made, including "with lotion, our softest ever!" and "regular". In the 1970s, color psychologist Dr. Cody Sweet represented newly styled Kleenex boxes as a national media spokesperson.

===== Scott =====
Scott is a brand name of paper napkins, paper towels and bath tissue/wipes.

===== Viva =====
Viva is a brand name of heavy-duty paper towels.

=== Mexican consumer product lines ===
Kimberly-Clark de Mexico manufactures and markets disposable diapers, feminine-care products, bathroom and facial tissue, napkins, kitchen towels, hand towels, and other paper-based and personal-care products in Mexico. Its brands include Huggies, KleenBebe, Pull-Ups, Evenflo, Kleenex, Kotex, Depend, Kleenex Cottonelle, Petalo, Suavel, Vogue, Sanitas, Marli, Kimlark, Jabon Escudo Antibacterial, and Jabones Kleenex.

=== Major professional and global products ===
==== KimWipes ====
KimWipes are a type of cleaning tissue commonly used in laboratories. They are used for wiping surfaces, parts, instruments, and laboratory lenses, and can be used to clean liquids, dust, and small particles. They are designed for delicate tasks and have low-lint properties. KimWipes are also FSC certified.

==== WypAll ====
WypAll is a brand of disposable cleaning wipes, towels, and cloths. Its products are used for general-purpose cleaning in industrial, commercial, and automotive environments. WypAll GeneralClean X60 Multi-Task Cleaning Cloths are designed to absorb water and remove grease, soil, sticky substances, and residue. They use HydroKnit technology to provide strength and durability for wet or dry cleaning and are disposable rather than laundered.

==== DryNites ====
DryNites is a brand of nighttime underwear for children who wet the bed. In the United States, DryNites products are branded as GoodNites.

==== Softex ====
Softex is a brand of feminine-care products in Indonesia.

== Leadership ==
Presidents and chairmen of the company have been:

=== President ===
1. John Alfred Kimberly, 1872–1928
2. Frank J. Sensenbrenner, 1928–1942
3. Cola Godden Parker, 1942–1953
4. John Robbins Kimberly, 1953–1959
5. William R. Kellett, 1959–1964
6. John R. Kimberly, 1964–1967
7. Guy McRae Minard, 1967–1970
8. Darwin Eatna Smith, 1970–1972
9. Harry John Sheerin, 1972–1978
10. Robert C. Ernest, 1978–

=== Chairman ===
1. Frank J. Sensenbrenner, 1942–1945
2. Cola Godden Parker, 1953–1955
3. John R. Kimberly, 1955–
4. Guy McRae Minard, 1970–1972
5. Darwin Eatna Smith, 1972–

== See also ==
- Kimberly Crest – Historic house in California, United States
- Toilet paper in the United States
