= Kotex =

Brand of menstrual hygiene products

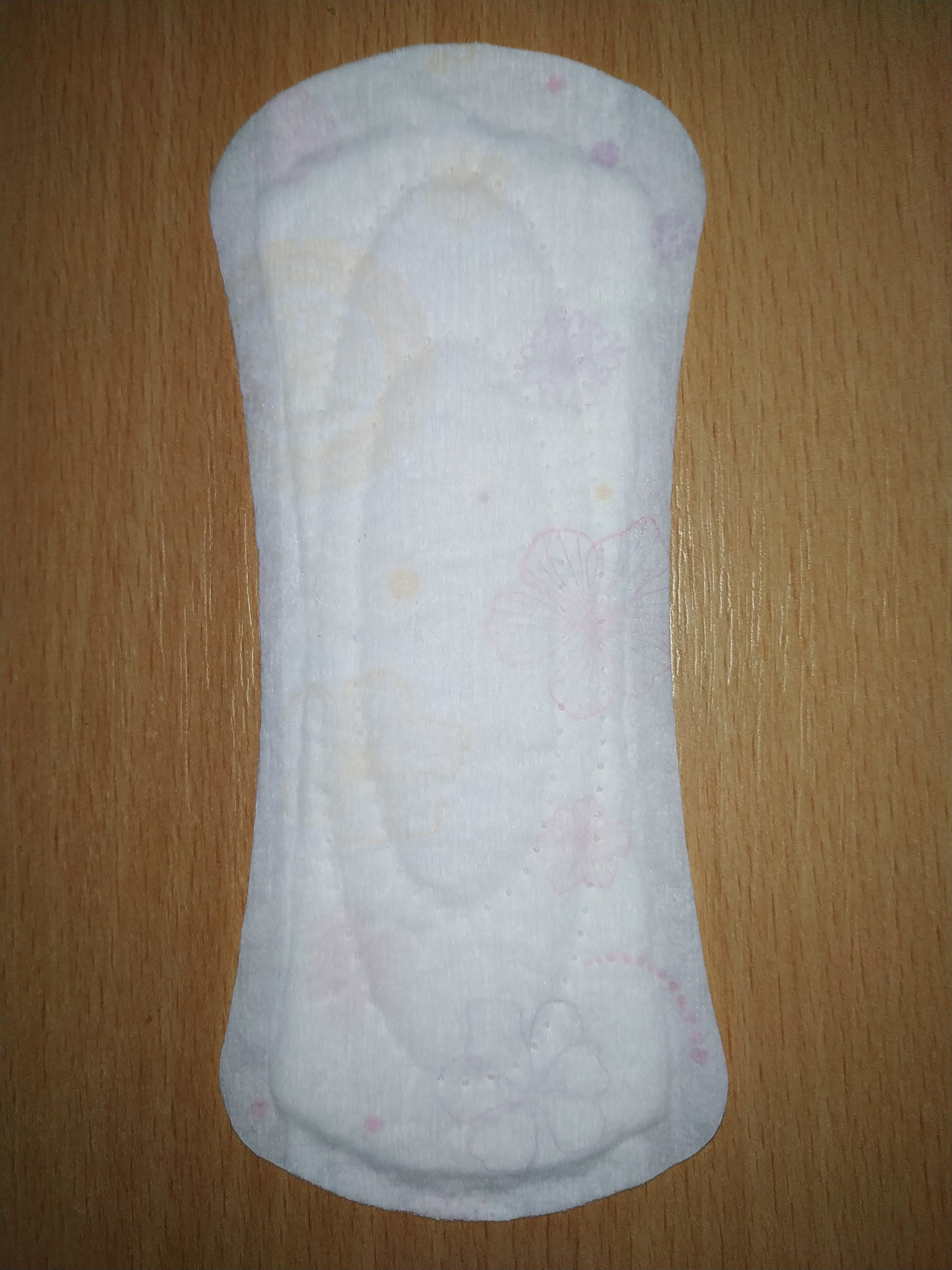
- A Kotex "Deo" pad
- Product type: Menstrual hygiene products
- Current owner: Kimberly-Clark
- Country: United States
- Introduced: 1920; 106 years ago
- Website: www.kotex.com

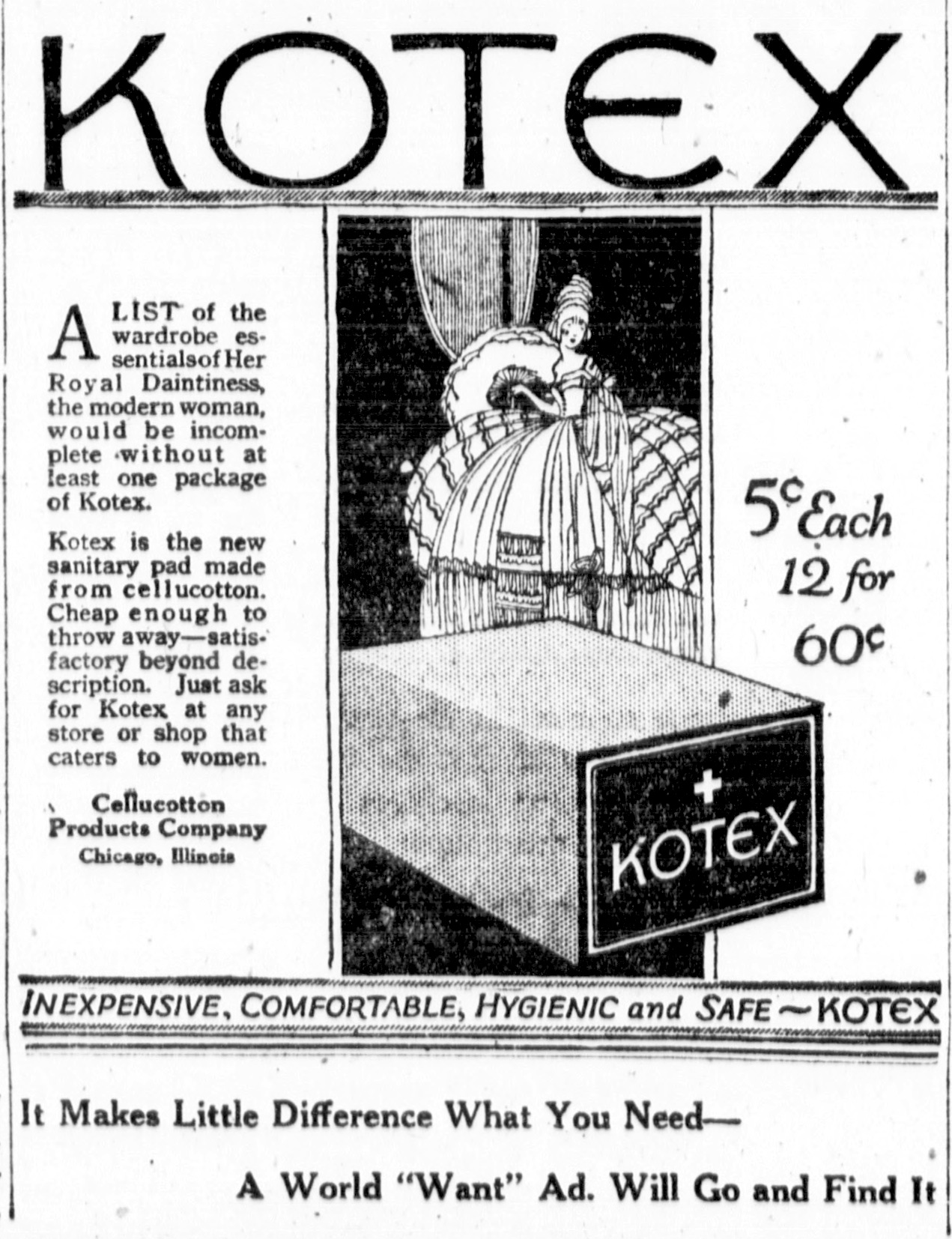
A Kotex newspaper advertisement from 1920

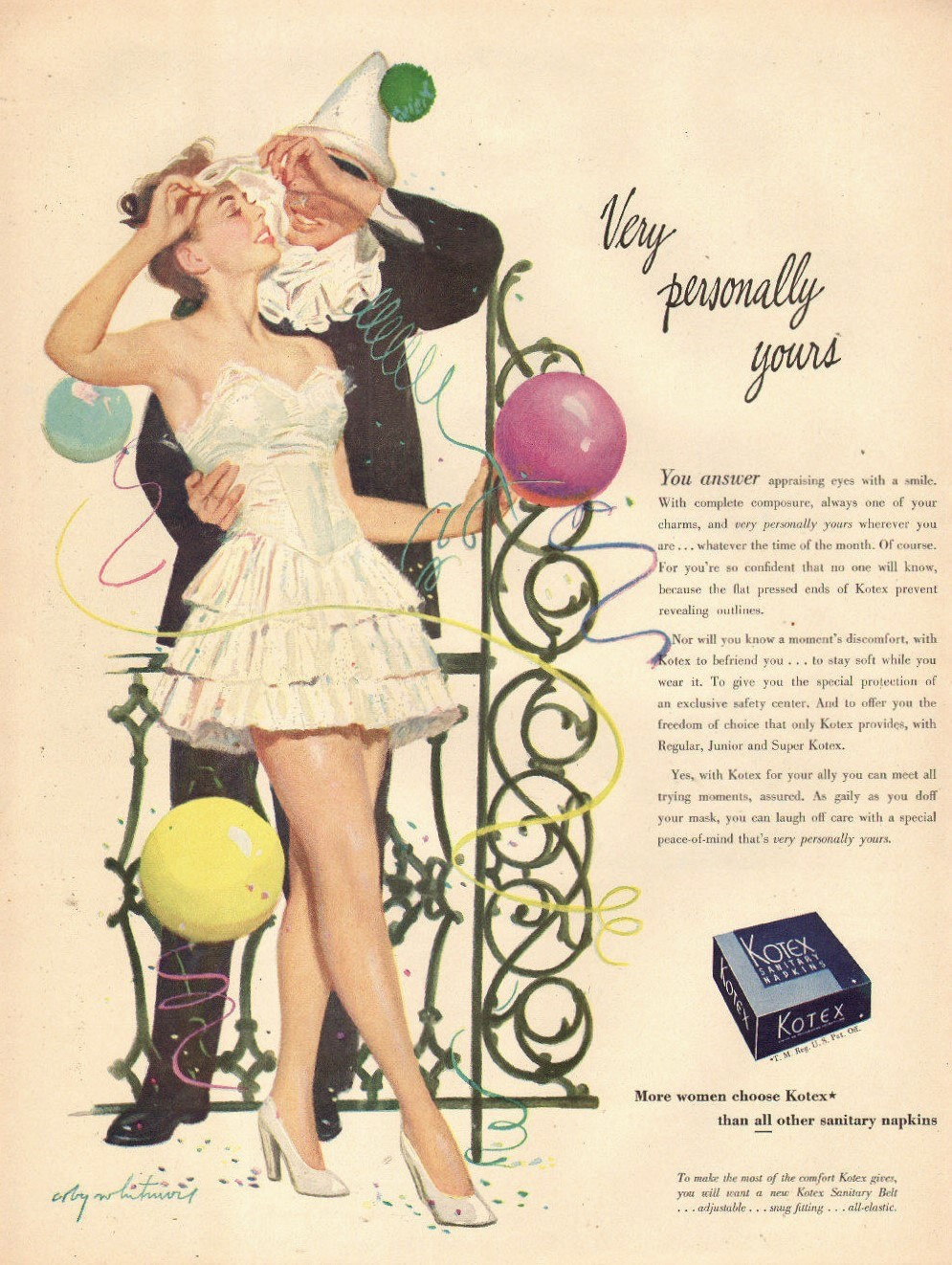
Kotex ad, painted by Coby Whitmore (1950)

Kotex (/ˈkoʊtɛks/; KOH-teks) is a global brand of menstrual hygiene products, which includes the Kotex maxi, teen and ultra-thin pads, Bamboo Pads and Liners, BioCare pads and Liners, U by Kotex Click tampons, and Kotex daily and absorbent liners. Kotex is owned and managed by Kimberly-Clark, a consumer products corporation active in more than 80 countries.

== History ==
The modern, commercial, disposable pads started in the late nineteenth century with the Hartmann company in Germany, and Johnson & Johnson in the United States. In the UK, the Birmingham firm of Southall Brothers & Barclay was advertising "sanitary towels" in The Family Doctor and Home Medical Adviser in the early 1890s.

In the United States, Kotex was launched in 1920 by Kimberly-Clark to make use of leftover cellucotton (wood pulp fiber) from World War One bandages. An employee noted that the pads had a "cotton-like texture" which was abbreviated to "cot-tex" and then made the product name with alternate spelling.

In the 1920s, Kimberly-Clark placed advertisements in the women's magazines Good Housekeeping and Ladies' Home Journal. Although some readers were offended by the ads, the product's success led to more advertisements. Kimberly-Clark also promoted Kotex in Good Housekeeping by using intimate advice columnist Mary Pauline Callender.

Originally sold in a hospital blue box at 12 for 60 cents (equivalent to $11 in 2025), Victorian sexual prudishness caused slow acceptance until Montgomery Ward began advertising them in its 1926 catalog, reaching $11 million sales in 1927 in 57 countries. It became one of the first self-service items in American retailing history after it was strategically placed on countertops with a special payment box so that the woman didn't have to ask a clerk for it and touch hands.Tampax appeared in 1936. Belts were needed until the 1970 introduction of Stayfree by Personal Products Co. and New Freedom Pads by Kimberly-Clark.

New Freedom is a former brand in the Kotex family. New Freedom was one of the first beltless pads manufactured in the early 1970s.

== Product line ==
In August 2009, Kotex launched a premium sub-brand called Kotex Luxe in Singapore. It launched U by Kotex Tween, products aimed at girls aged 8–12 in the US in 2011.

In March of 2010, U by Kotex was introduced as a platform re-brand focused on bold new packaging, feminine care product design and women's empowerment. Tampons, pads and liners under the Balance, Balance Teen, Clean & Secure, Click, Lightdays, Security, Cleanwear, Fitness, Sleek and Barely There banners highlighted some of the portfolio offerings during this era.

In February of 2026, the brand opted to re-assume the Kotex brand name and introduced new ultra thin pads, teen pads, maxi pads, daily liners and absorbent liners to the market under the Kotex, Kotex Teen, Kotex Bamboo and Kotex BioCare banners. New innovations in this re-brand included the implementation of organically-grown materials and more focus on pH optimization in certain products.

Current products under the Kotex brand include:

- Kotex Ultra Thin Pads – Kotex menstrual pads feature the brand's Gravity Core absorbent system to pull fluid toward the bottom of the pad and provide everyday leak protection, breathability, and comfort across multiple absorbency levels.
- Kotex BioCare Pads – Kotex BioCare is a line of ultra‑thin pads and combining Gravity Core absorbent technology with a pH Proactive System that is designed to help defend against odor and irritants and is dermatologist‑tested to be gentle on skin.
- Kotex Bamboo Pads – Kotex Bamboo is a line of pads that uses an ultrasoft, breathable top layer made from 100% bamboo‑derived viscose.
- Kotex Teen – Kotex Teen is a teen‑focused extension of the Kotex pads portfolio, offering day and overnight pads that are sized for teens while retaining comparable protection and comfort.
- Kotex Ultra Thin Overnight Pads – Kotex Ultra Thin Overnight and Extra Heavy Overnight menstrual pads feature Gravity Core technology to pull blood toward the bottom of the pad plus a raised back barrier and side guards to provide up to 100% leak‑free overnight protection for up to 12 hours and help you feel clean and dry no matter how you sleep. These features span across Bamboo, BioCare and Teen overnight pads.
- Kotex Maxi Pads – Kotex Maxi Pads provide security through an Xpress Dri Core that absorbs instantly. Kotex Maxi Overnight and Extra Heavy Overnight pads are maxi pads designed for overnight use featuring a larger back (60–80% larger than comparable ultra thin pads) to provide up to 12 hours of night‑time coverage with a soft‑touch cover in winged and non‑winged formats.
- U by Kotex Click - U by Kotex Click Compact Tampons are a line of compact menstrual tampons that extend from a small, portable applicator into a full-size tampon before insertion, designed for on‑the‑go use in regular, super, and super plus absorbencies.
- Kotex Daily Liners – Kotex Daily Liners are everyday panty liners designed for sweat, light flow, and discharge. These are offered in thong, thin, regular, and extra‑coverage formats to better meet user needs outside of their normal menstrual cycle. For added benefits, Kotex also offers Bamboo Liners featuring a viscose top layer made from bamboo(for ultra-soft protection) and BioCare Liners (featuring pH Proactive System).
- Kotex Ultra Thin Overnight Pads – Kotex Ultra Thin Overnight and Extra Heavy Overnight pads are Gravity Core–based menstrual pads that pull blood toward the bottom of the pad and use "Night Defense" features such as a raised back barrier and side guards to provide up to 100% leak‑free overnight protection and a clean, dry feel.

== Social causes ==
Launched in 2018, Kotex has been the founding sponsor of the Alliance for Period Supplies. In conjunction with its retailer partners, the brand has donated more than 40 million period products nationwide as a way to fight period poverty. The launch of the alliance came on the heels of a study in which 2 out of 5 people who experience menstruation struggle to purchase period supplies because of lack of income. Additionally, findings from a YouGov poll indicated that 76% of surveyed Americans wished to see free period supplies in schools.

In 2020, Kotex celebrated its 100^{th} anniversary by committing $2.5 million over a three year period to Plan International to expand menstrual hygiene access as part of the "She Can" initiative. These efforts also aimed to fight period stigma within society and ensure access to feminine care products and education.

In 2026, Kotex launched its new global brand platform, 'Own Your Flow.'

== Safety and sustainability ==
In response to study findings published in June 2024 alleging that trace levels of metals were discovered in a variety of tampon brands, Kotex maintained that not only were heavy metals not added to Kotex products, they were prohibited from their manufacturing process.

Because tampons and menstrual pads are classified as medical devices in the United States, their safety is regulated by the United States Food & Drug Administration. In addition to FDA regulation adherence, Kotex also tests products against standards such as ISO-10993, which are internationally-recognized safety standards in the medical device class.

Kimberly-Clark, the parent company of Kotex, maintains a Restricted Substances list, which includes prohibition of use of substances like PFA's, parabens, pthalates, formaldehyde-releasing preservatives.

== Recalls and defects ==
In September 2012, Kimberly-Clark issued a warning regarding a shipment of rejected Kotex tampons stolen and sold to the public. The company said the defective products posed only a minor health risk to consumers.

In December 2018, Kimberly-Clark issued a recall of U by Kotex Sleek tampons due to findings that the product would sometimes break apart during removal, leaving behind fragments in the body that could require medical attention for removal.

== "Red Dot" controversy ==
The infamous "Red Dot" shown above a Kotex pad.

In 2004, advertisements featuring a CG anthropomorphic red punctuation dot, known as the Red Dot, were televised with the slogan "Kotex fits. Period." That slogan was launched for the product's marketing campaign in October 2000. The Red Dot, referring to a woman's "period", dissolves on the pad. This was viewed as questionable because of the likelihood that the ads could be viewed by children who had no understanding of the terminology used in the ad. In 2005, it was announced that the slogan would no longer be used for the product due to it having harmed sales of the product, realizing that its advertised meaning for "menstruation" was never meant to be publicized in front of children, even with the use of an animated red punctuation mark.
