= Huggies Pull-Ups =

Brand of disposable training pants

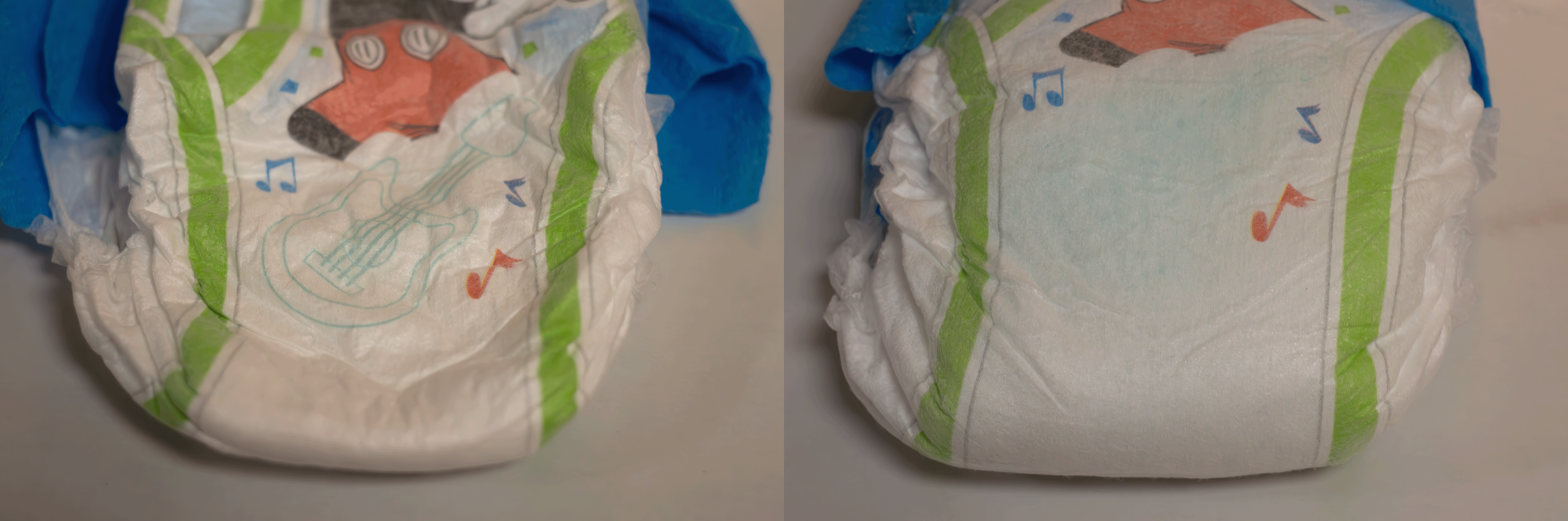
- Dry vs. Wet Huggies Pull-Ups
- Type: protective clothing

Pull-Ups is a brand of disposable diapers made under the Huggies brand of baby products. The product was first introduced in 1989 and became popular with the slogan "I'm a big kid now!" The training pants are marketed with purple packaging. Boys' designs are blue and currently feature Mickey Mouse. Girls' designs are purple and currently feature Minnie Mouse and Daisy Duck.

== Huggies Pull-Ups variations ==
Huggies Pull-Ups have been distributed in 4 different types which have been intact since 2011. (not counting the renaming of Wetness Liner.)

=== Learning Designs ===
In March 2005, the original Huggies Pull-Ups were renamed Learning Designs in most countries after the small pictures that fade when they become wet.

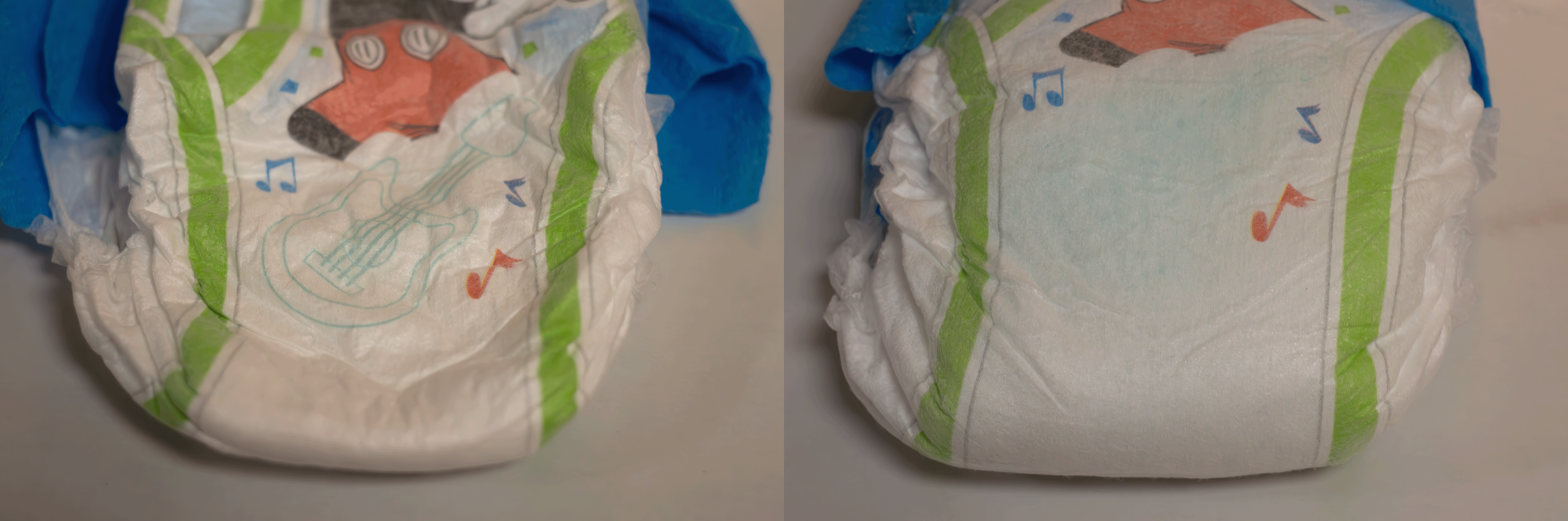
The Wetness indicator on a pair of Huggies Pull-Up's. Left Side is Dry. Right side is with Water poured in.

=== Wetness Liner ===
Wetness Liner Pull-Ups Training Pants were first distributed in 2005 as a competitor to the now defunct Pampers Feel 'N Learn. These Pull-Ups were much like Learning Designs Pull-Ups, except they added special liner to the Wetness Liner ones. This liner is placed on the inside of the Pull-up, where the wearer is most likely to wet, and is sensitive to urine. When the Wetness Liner is exposed to urine, it causes the wearer to feel uncomfortable, and learn that they shouldn't wet themself and should use the toilet instead. Wetness Liner Pull-Ups also have the Learning Designs, which also fade when the wearer wets the pull-up.

=== GoodNites ===
GoodNites are used to control bedwetting. In 2008, The GoodNites disposable underwear split up from the Pull Ups brand merging with the Huggies brand. Later, in 2011, GoodNites split up from the Huggies brand and formed their own brand which is the same name as the product.

== Potty training ==
The main use for Pull-Ups Training Pants is as an aid for toilet training toddlers and to help them learn not to wet. Although, up until 2000, Pull-Ups Training Pants were nothing more than diapers with flexible sides for the wearer to easily pull off and on like underwear, since 2000, there have been several changes to them.

The first of these changes was the addition of designs (now known as Learning Designs since 2005) on the inside only from 2005 to 2007 and front of the pant that fade when the wearer wets it as a way of discouraging wetting, and as a motivation to stay dry in time to make it to the potty, and if the wearer stays dry, the designs will stay on the Pull-Up.

The second change was the addition of Easy-Open sides. These allow the sides of the Pull-Up to still be pulled off and on like underwear, but enable parents to easily open the Pull-Up to check to see if the wearer has soiled the Pull-Up, or to quickly change a messy Pull-Up. Though many have praised this feature, some parents have criticised this feature for causing the Pull-Up to rip too easily.

== Sponsorships ==
Pull-Ups are the official sponsor of ESPN Radio's coverage of Major League Baseball, as well as Westwood One's coverage of Sunday Night Football, and on many terrestrial broadcast television stations and children's TV brands, including Nickelodeon, Disney, Cartoon Network, etc.

== See also ==
- Huggies
- Toilet training
