= Kleenex =

Brand name for a variety of paper-based products

- Logo used since 2024 with an updated color based on the 2020 logo

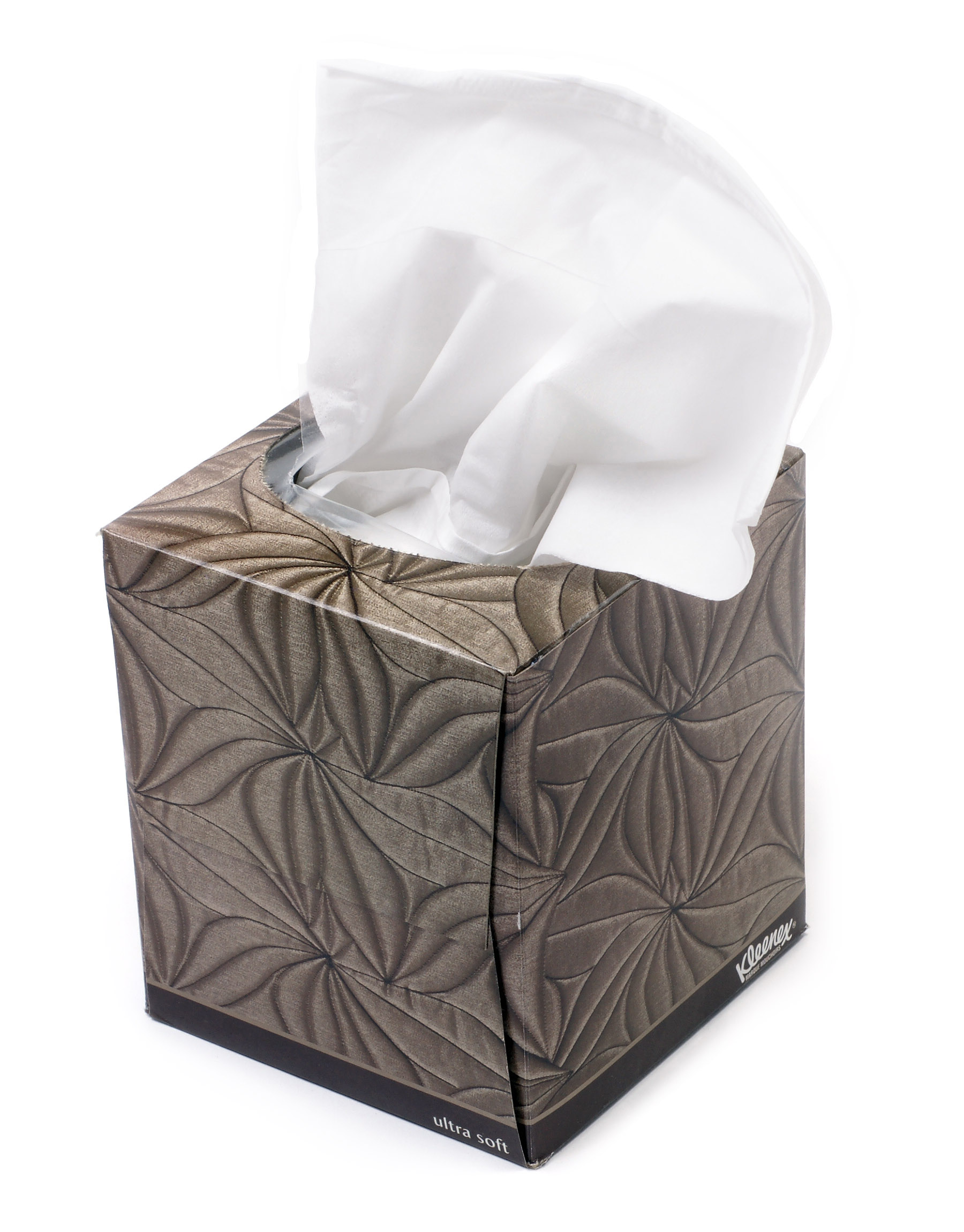
- A box of Kleenex facial tissues
- Product type: Facial Tissue
- Current owner: Kimberly-Clark
- Country: United States
- Introduced: June 12, 1924; 102 years ago
- Markets: Worldwide except Canada
- Previous owners: International Cellucotton Products Company
- Registered as a trademark in: United States
- Website: www.kleenex.com/en-us

Kleenex is a brand name primarily known for its line of facial tissues. Often used informally as a genericized trademark for facial tissue, Kleenex is a registered trademark of Kimberly-Clark applied to products made in 78 countries. The brand also includes other paper products, such as napkins and toilet paper.

== History ==
Kleenex began during the First World War when the Cellucotton Company developed a crepe paper gas mask filter. In the 1920s, the product was modified into the menstrual pad Kotex. A further modification of the original crepe paper made it thinner and softer, and the resultant 1924 product was called "Kleenex" and marketed as a cold cream remover. In line with the company's requirement that its brand names be short, easy to say, and easy to explain, the name Kleenex was selected because the "Kleen" portion, a sensational spelling of the word "clean", denotes its cleansing purpose. The "ex" was added to show that Kleenex belonged to the family of products that included Kotex. It was the first disposable, paper-based facial tissue marketed in the Western world, and it was sold as a substitute for face towels or cotton wool.

In 1925, the first Kleenex ad appeared in magazines, promoting "the new secret of keeping a pretty skin as used by famous movie stars". A few years after the introduction of Kleenex, Cellucotton's head researcher tried to persuade the head of advertising to market the tissue for colds and hay fever. The administrator rejected the idea but then committed a small amount of ad space to mentioning the use of Kleenex tissue as a handkerchief. By the 1930s, Kleenex was being marketed with the slogan "Don't Carry a Cold in Your Pocket", and its use as a disposable handkerchief replacement became predominant. In 1943, Kleenex began licensing the Little Lulu cartoon character to popularize the brand.

An older, retouched version of the Kleenex logo, as used from 1992 to 2007.

== Trademark ==
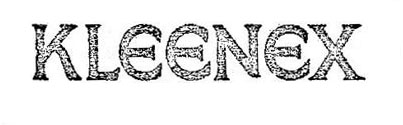
Original 1925 Kleenex trademark.

The original Kleenex trademark application at the United States Patent and Trademark Office (USPTO) was filed in the class of Medical, Beauty, & Agricultural Services by Cellucotton Products Company of Neenah, Wisconsin, on July 12, 1924. The description provided to the USPTO was "absorbent pads or sheets for removing cold cream".

In the application, Cellucotton claimed that it had used the drawing and stylized word mark in commerce since June 12, 1924. The USPTO granted trademark registration on November 25, 1924. International Cellucotton Products Company officially assigned trademark interest and goodwill of the business to Kimberly-Clark Corporation on September 30, 1955. Kimberly-Clark Corporation of Neenah, Wisconsin, is the current registered owner of the Kleenex trademark.

Nationwide marketing of Kleenex in the United States (as a means of removing cold cream rather than as a tissue for sneezes) was rolled out in the first week of September 1924 in Chicago with an ad for the Walgreen drug store chain on September 2 and with an offer on September 4 for a free sample in New York City.

In the U.S., the Kleenex name has become—in common usage but not in law—genericized. The popularity of the product has led to the use of its name to refer to any facial tissue, regardless of the brand. Many dictionaries, including Merriam-Webster and Oxford, now define it as such.

In 2023, Kimberly-Clark announced that it would no longer be selling the brand in Canada, citing transportation costs. The brand had a 16 percent market share at the time, but the cost of shipping meant profitability was low.

== Diapers ==
In 1978, Kimberly-Clark introduced Kleenex Super Dry diapers with wetness indicators in the form of a design that fades as the inside of the diaper becomes wetter. The Huggies brand, introduced in 1977, is Kimberly-Clark's current diaper brand.

== See also ==
- Man of Steel, Woman of Kleenex
