= Kruger Inc. =

Canadian private company

- Type: Private
- Industry: Paper products, Energy, Utilities, Real-estate
- Founded: 1904
- Founder: Joseph Kruger
- Headquarters: Montreal, Quebec, Canada
- Key people: Joseph Kruger II (Chairman and Chief Executive Officer)
- Owner: Kruger family
- Number of employees: 5,500 (2026)
- Subsidiaries: Tissue Products, Containerboard and Packaging, Recycling, Publication Papers, Forest Products, , Wines and Spirits, Energy & Real-estate
- Website: kruger.com

Kruger Inc. is a Canadian private company which manufactures publication papers, lumber and other wood products, corrugated cartons from recycled fibres, green and renewable energy, and wines and spirits. Kruger Inc. operates facilities in Québec, Ontario, British Columbia, Newfoundland and Labrador, and the United States. KP Tissue, Inc. is a separate, publicly traded holding company, headquartered in Mississauga, Ontario, Canada.

== History ==
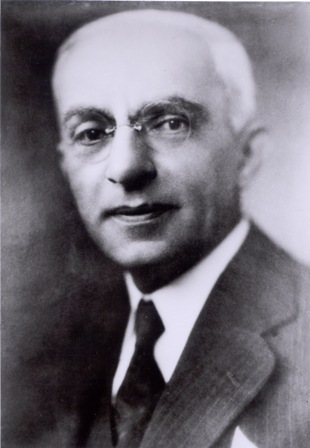
Joseph Kruger I

The origins of Kruger Inc. date back to 1904, when Joseph Kruger I founded a fine paper business in Montreal. Gene H. Kruger, the founder's son, became president of the company in 1928 at the age of 25 and expanded it into the manufacture of newsprint, paperboard, and tissue products.

As chairman of the board and CEO, Joseph Kruger II, Gene's son, has overseen the company's continual expansion into specialty publication papers, North American tissue products, wines and spirits, forest and wood products, renewable energy and recycling, as well as its modernization with special emphasis on the environment.

== Activities ==
The company's activities are divided into two major divisions: Industrial Products (publication papers, forest products, containerboard and packaging) and Consumer Products (tissue products, wines and spirits). Kruger Inc.’s subsidiary, Kruger Energy, develops and operates hydroelectric, solar, wind power, biomass cogeneration and biogas energy projects.

Kruger has sorting and recovery centres that supply its mills with recycled paper and containerboard for the production of recycled stock and recycled paper products.

=== Industrial products ===
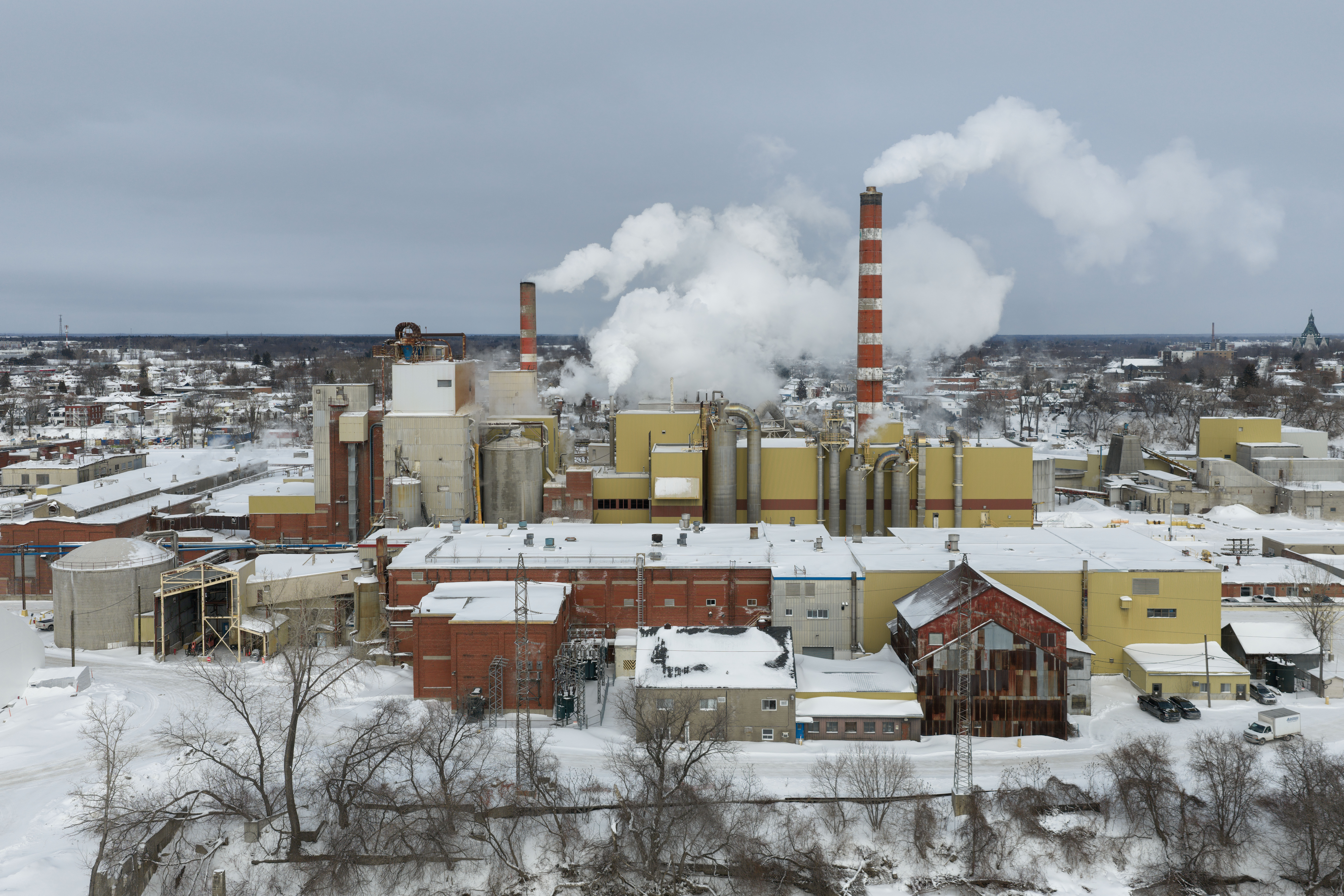
Kruger Wayagamack pulp-and-paper mill in Trois-Rivières, QC

==== Publication papers ====
This Kruger business unit produces newsprint, and coated, directory and supercalendered paper.

Kruger Publication Papers comprises four paper mills, three of which are located in Québec: Trois-Rivières, Kruger-Wayagamack, Brompton (Sherbrooke), and the other in Newfoundland and Labrador: Corner Brook Pulp and Paper Limited. All four paper mills are certified under ISO 9001:2000 (Quality Management), PwC ICoCTM (Chain of Custody) and PEFC (Chain of Custody). Each has its own recycling facilities, secondary effluent treatment system, and environmental and energy conservation programs. Two paper mills also have deinking facilities and produce approximately 300,000 tonnes of deinked pulp per year, which is used to manufacture various Kruger Inc. paper and tissue products.

==== Containerboard and packaging ====
Kruger owns KRUPACK Packaging. Its plants in LaSalle (Quebec) and Brampton (Ontario) manufacture containers for food, beverages, dairy products, meat, fruit and vegetables, flowers, chemicals, textiles and clothing. They also produce boxes for large electrical appliances, auto parts and other industrial products.

=== Consumer products ===
==== Tissue products ====
Kruger's Tissue Products business unit includes four mills in Canada: Crabtree, Sherbrooke, Gatineau, New Westminster, and one in the United States: Memphis, Tennessee. Its mills have a combined annual papermaking capacity of approximately 294,000 gross air dried metric tonnes (GADMT), which represents 37% of Canada's total installed tissue manufacturing capacity, making Kruger Inc. Canada’s leading tissue, products manufacturer.

Kruger Products’ Away-From-Home business leads the Canadian tissue market by providing quality products to market segments such as office buildings, healthcare, food service, manufacturing, and lodging. Designed to meet unique end-user needs, the product line includes bath and facial tissue, towels, wipes, napkins and skin care products.

Brands include Cashmere, Scotties, SpongeTowels, Purex, White Swan, and White Cloud.

==== Wines and spirits ====
The Wines and Spirits business unit was created in September 2006, when Kruger Inc. acquired Maison des Futailles, L.P., a Québec company founded in 1922 by SAQ's bottling plant. Maison de Futailles joined with and became Station 22 in March, 2022. Kruger sold the division in 2022.

==== Kuger Energy ====
Kruger Energy specializes in renewable energy, such as hydroelectricity, wind energy, biomass cogeneration, and biogas energy.

== Boreal forest destruction ==
A 2007 Greenpeace report on the state of Canada's boreal forests states, "Less than 48 per cent of the total area under Kruger management in Quebec and Ontario remains intact. Kruger is involved in severe controversy on the Island of René-Lavasseur, where logging is carrying on not only in intact forest areas but also in important caribou habitat and without respect for the rights of traditional land owners, the Innu First Nation of Betsiamites....None of Kruger's forested lands is certified to the standards of the Forest Stewardship Council." Kruger achieved FSC certification in March 2011.
