= Training pants =

Type of incontinence garment

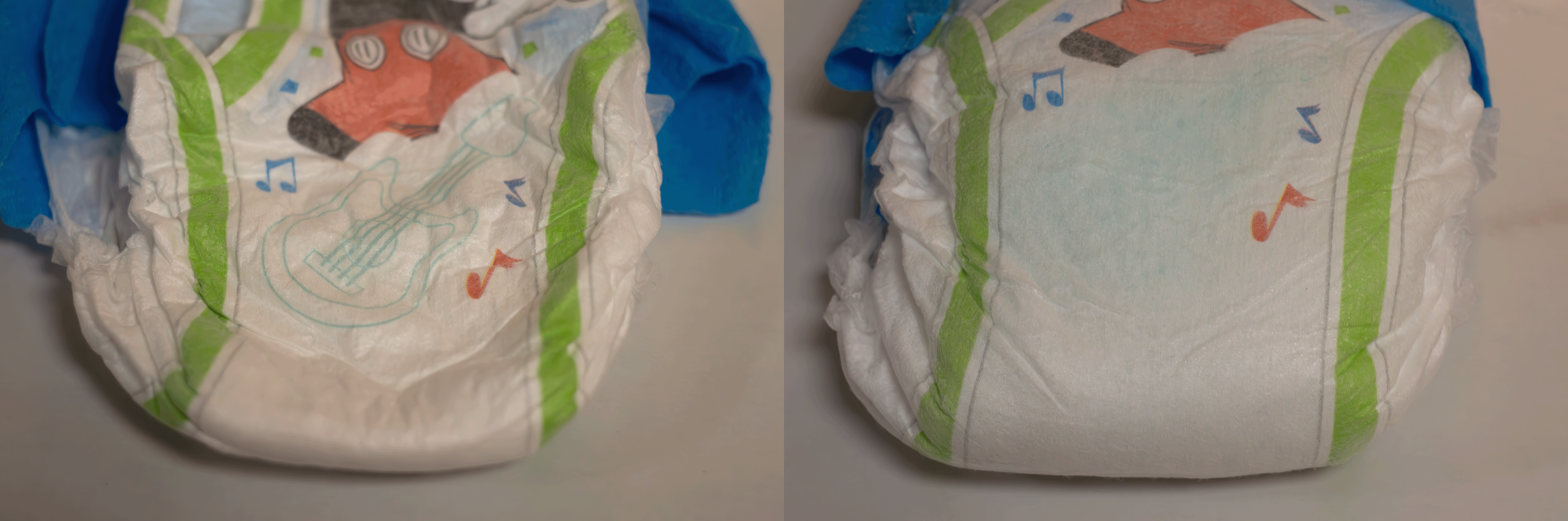
- Dry vs. Wet Huggies Pull-Ups
- Type: protective clothing

Training pants are undergarments used by incontinent people, typically toddlers, as an aid for toilet training. They are intended to be worn between wearing diapers and being ready to wear regular underpants. Training pants may be reusable and made of fabric, or they may be disposable. In the US, disposable training pants may also be referred to as "pull-ups", and in the UK, training pants are frequently referred to as nappy pants or trainer pants.

The main benefit of training pants over diapers is that, unlike traditional diapers, they can be easily pulled down to sit on a potty or toilet and pulled back up for reuse. The main benefit of wearing training pants over regular underpants is that if the person has an accident, they do not soil their environment.

They are designed to wick moisture away from the skin to prevent diaper rash. Some training pants also feature a wetness indicator line that allows the child to feel when an accident has occurred, supporting toilet-training awareness and independence.

== Disposable pants ==
=== Flexible sides ===
Many toilet-training pants feature flexible sides, so the wearer can easily pull them on and off like regular underwear. This is to increase independence and make training easier, and is designed to be child-friendly and to look like normal underwear, unlike most traditional diapers, which are fastened with inexpensive velcro straps, though they are adjustable for tightness. Also, unlike standard diapers, the sides are already fastened, allowing wearers to put them on independently.

Some brands include strong Velcro on the sides, intended to keep the pants in place while allowing the parent to remove them if necessary. Conversely, the sides may be more vulnerable to breaking and are liable to lose the psychological benefit of moving away from diapers.

=== Leak guards ===
In addition, all training pants have leak protection in case the wearer wets them. When the pant is wet, urine is drawn into a compartment that absorbs the wetness, much like a diaper. This is used to prevent moisture from ruining any clothing around it and to ensure privacy. However, if too much urine is absorbed, it can break open, exposing the foam that absorbs the urine. Many companies have allowed a fairly large amount of absorbency in their pants, mainly to make them appropriate to be used for night trainers who wet the bed.

=== Wetness indicator ===
In many cases, a training pant contains a wetness indicator.

This is a set of designs printed in special ink that evaporates from liquid that is absorbed from the wearer, specifically urine, near the area that is most commonly urinated. When the child does wet the pants, these designs smudge to the point of fading completely to white. This is intended to be an incentive for staying dry, a way to discourage wetting, and a way to identify when they are wet. Such a feature was first sold to consumers in 2000.

=== Wetness lining ===
In addition to the visual wetness indicator, some companies have gone so far as to introduce a liner inside their training pants, specifically in the area most frequently used for urination. This liner is intended to cause wearers to feel discomfort or cold during urination, thus conditioning them to use the toilet. Pampers was the first one to use this feature with their Feel 'N Learn trainers, which were based specifically around the use of the wetness liner. This product and most other wetness liner products are now discontinued, likely due to a lack of consumer interest. Most companies that use this feature also use the wetness indicator on their training pants. When Huggies used this feature on their Pull-Ups, they claimed that the wetness indicator is best suited for visual learners, while the wetness liners are for those who learn by feeling.

=== Designs ===
Some training pants depict licensed characters that are likely to be recognized by young children.

Huggies has used Disney Princesses, Toy Story, Cars, Mickey Mouse, and Minnie Mouse on their Pull-ups. Pampers has used Bluey and My Little Pony: Friendship is Magic on their Easy Ups. Licensed characters are used on training pants to motivate the wearer by making the garment more enjoyable.

== See also ==
- Diaper
- Huggies Pull-Ups
- Pampers Easy Ups
