= Huggies =

American brand of baby and toddler products

- Logo used since 2021

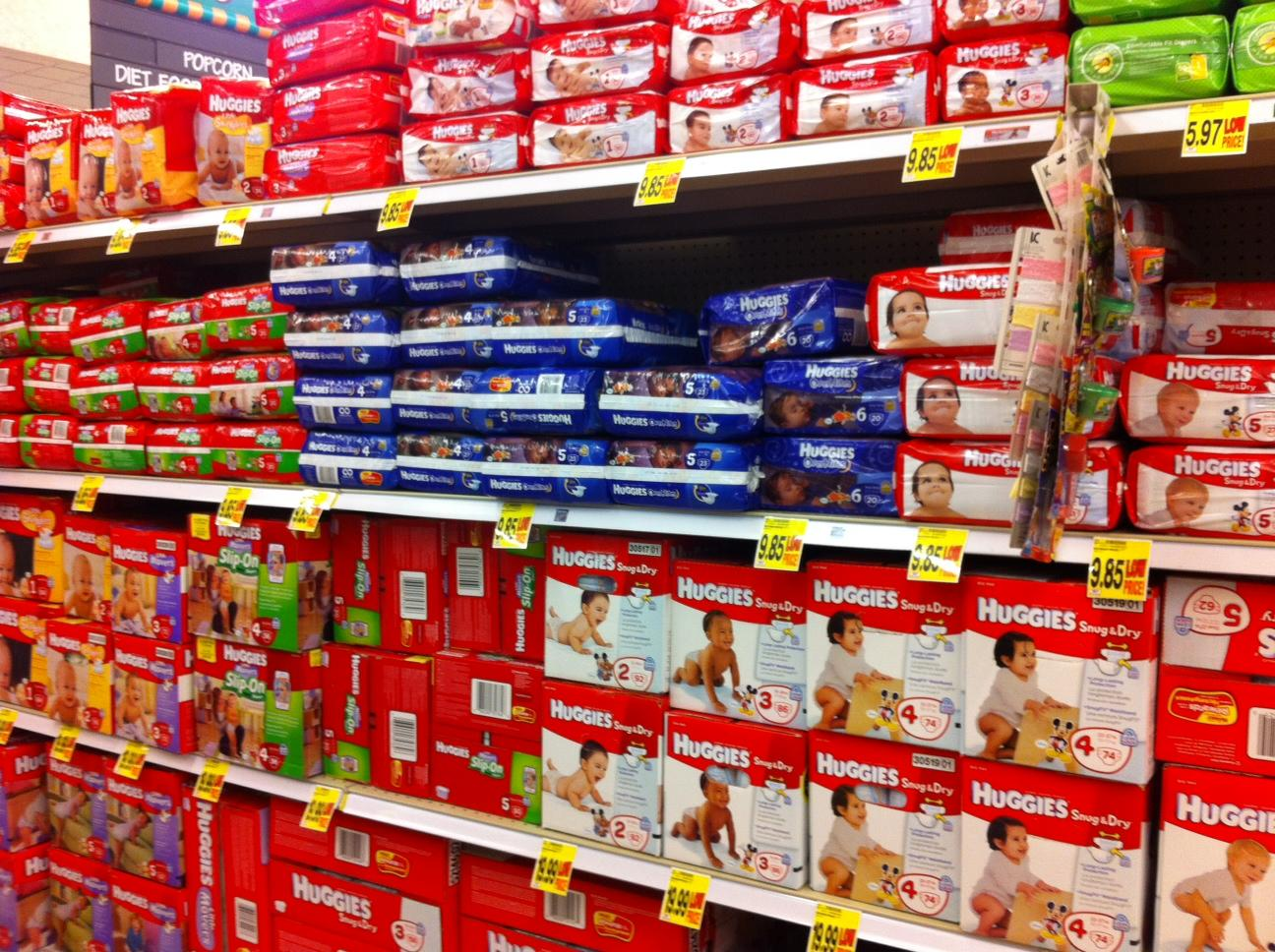
- Type: Subsidiary brand of baby diapers.
- Founded: 1968; 58 years ago (test market as Kimbies); 1977; 49 years ago (as Kleenex Huggies)
- Products: Diapers, training pants, baby wipes
- Owner: Kimberly-Clark
- Website: www.huggies.com

Huggies is an American brand that sells disposable diapers and baby wipes that is marketed by American company Kimberly-Clark. Huggies were first test marketed in 1968, then introduced to the public in 1977 to replace the Kimbies brand.

== History ==
Kimberly-Clark started delving into the diaper market in 1966. They introduced the Kimbies brand of diapers in 1968. Kimberly-Clark scientist Frederick J. Hrubecky designed the initial diaper and was granted a patent in 1973. Hrubecky experimented with diaper technology that included body contouring which would adapt better than standard fit diapers. Kimberly-Clark installed $1 million of fold production equipment, including the first experimental folding machine in a mill in Memphis, Tennessee. Hrubecky incorporated diaper adhesive tapes that replaced safety pins after consumer tests in Denver and Salt Lake City proved they were one of the best features. Kimbies production suffered in the early 1970s after a strike occurred at the Memphis plant. In 1974, the adhesives were switched from plastisol to latex due to increased costs. This led to negative feedback due to latex being less durable. Engineers in the Memphis, Beech Island, South Carolina, and New Milford, Connecticut mills devised a wide variety of tissue machine designs that would eventually incorporate layers of absorbent padding of varying thickness. As it was designed to fit snugly, the name Kleenex Huggies was chosen and the redesigned diaper was introduced in December 1977.

== Products ==
Huggies are diapers designed for premature babies, newborns, and infants, with varieties available for both daytime and nighttime use. Additionally, Huggies is the creator of Pull-Ups and Natural Care Wipes.

Pure & Natural Diapers were introduced in 2009 and marketed as an environmentally friendly alternative to traditional Huggies diapers. In 2019, Huggies introduced Special Delivery, incorporating plant-based materials. In 2024, Huggies introducted Skin Essentials, replacing Special Delivery.

GoodNites is a line of disposable diapers made for children and adolescents who wet the bed at night. They formerly carried the Huggies logo, but are now labeled simply as "GoodNites" and are no longer sold under the Huggies brand.

=== Sex specific diapers ===
In Australia and certain other countries, Huggies diapers are typically marketed in sex-specific versions for boys and girls.

== Discontinued products ==
- Huggies Clean Team was a line of children's bath products and wipes, now mostly discontinued. The flushable wipes that were formerly under the "Clean Team" brand are now sold under "Pull-Ups".
- Introduced in 2003, Huggies Convertibles were discontinued due to leak problems.
