= Strandbloemen =

Paper beach flower

Strandbloemen are handmade tissue paper artificial flowers that are offered for sale by children on Belgian beaches. The tradition is around 100 years old and is unique to Belgium. It's a form of trading: the flowers are exchanged for seashells.

== Historical background ==
When and how the tradition of strandbloemen exactly finds its origin, is not yet known. However, it already existed at the end of the 1920s before coastal tourism was in full swing. In 2016, the "strand in bloei". project was set up by the Erfgoedcel Kusterfgoed with the goal of drawing attention to and outline the history of the tradition of strandbloemen. One can find strandbloemen all along the Belgian coasts, from De Panne to Knokke. In the adjacent coastal areas of the Netherlands and France, the phenomenon does not exist and is therefore uniquely Belgian. Although the tradition is decreasing in popularity in some places, organisations like the Erfgoedcel Kustergoed have always striven for the tradition's recognition as intangible cultural heritage. In 2014, Katrien Vermeire made a short film about the tradition ("Der Kreislauf") and the tradition was granted its status as intangible cultural heritage in 2021.

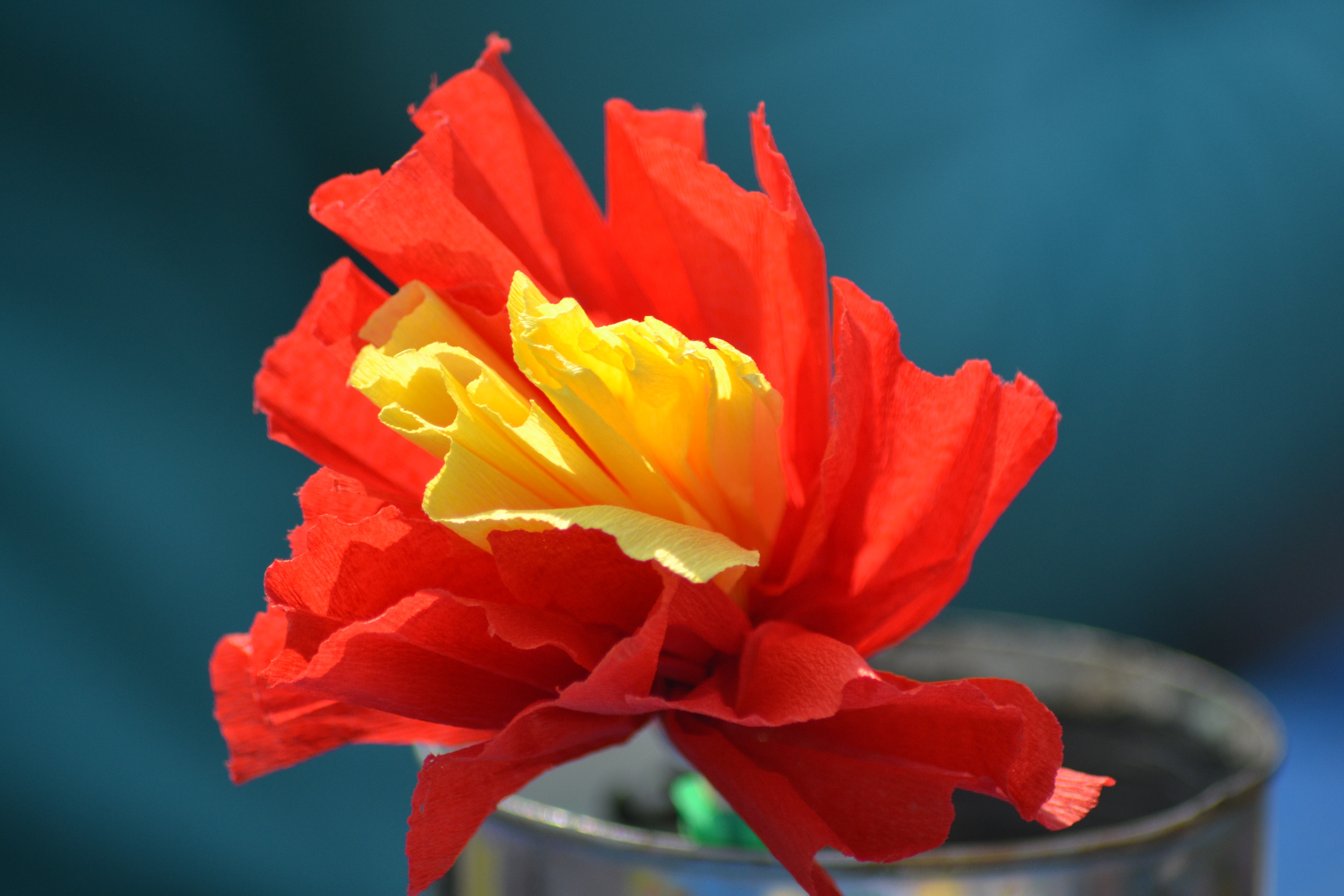
Strandbloem (paper beach flower)

== The flowers and their sale ==
The flowers are made from tissue paper and attached to wooden sticks. They are put into the sand in a line, sometimes on a small self-made mound of sand. Behind, there's a hole in which both boys and girls sit to run their shops. They often buy flowers from other "retailers" to sell them on, with or without profit. However, the actual making of the flowers is carried out by their parents and/or grandparents. More recently, there are even courses being organised and books and brochures being published to help (grand)parents master the craft.

The flowers are never sold for money, but always for seashells. The required types and quantities needed for trading vary between coastal areas. For example, on the East and West coasts, they're usually paid for with couteautjes (a name derived from the French couteaux, meaning knife or saw). These shells are more commonly known to us as banded wedge shells. Because of their rarity, these kinds of shells are required for a fair trade. On the East Coast, you pay five to fifteen shells per flower. On the West Coast, where they are less rare, they can cost between 50 and 100 shells per flower.

The Middle Coast is the only part where children pay with "handjes", referring to the one or more handfuls full of shells they need to buy the flowers. The shells can be mixed, but no mussels, oysters and razor clams can be mixed into them as they fill the children's hands too quickly. In the 1960s and 1970s, some places used conch shells to pay. However, as these became too rare, they were replaced by other shells, most often couteautjes. In Bredene, one conch can still be traded for 50 couteautjes.

== See also ==
- Wrapping tissue
