= Fluff pulp =

Material used to make bulky and absorbent products

Fluff pulp (also called comminution pulp or fluffy pulp) is a type of chemical pulp made from long fibre softwoods. Important parameters for fluff pulp are bulk and water absorbency.

== History ==
Fluff pulp was first developed for use in disposable sanitary napkins. Kotex's first advertisement for products made with wood pulp (Cellucotton) appeared in 1921. Disposable diaper producers also were early to convert to fluff pulp because of its low cost and high absorbency. Normal usage of fluff pulp in a diaper was about 55 percent. In the 1980s started the commercialization of air-laid paper, which gave better bulk, porosity, strength, softness, and water absorption properties compared with normal tissue paper. Also in the 1980s started the use of superabsorbents in diapers and reduced the need for fluff pulp and is now down to 15 grams or even less. The demand of the pulp in diapers has gone from being the absorbent of liquid to giving the products dry and wet strength.

== Manufacture ==
More than 90% of the fluff pulps are fully bleached chemical softwood pulps, of which more than 90% are kraft pulps.

The most common raw material source for fluff pulps are southern bleached softwood kraft (SBSK) from loblolly pine. SBSK from other species and NBSK are also used to make fluff pulp. Thicker fibres are preferred to improve the bulk.

Fluff pulp is normally made rolls (reels) on a drying machine (a simplified Fourdrinier machine). The objective of the drying/sheeting operation is to produce a uniform sheet (paper density, moisture, and strength) to the converting operation. The pulp may be impregnated with debonders before drying to ease defibration.

The worldwide production of fluff pulps amounts to about 3.5 million tons.

== Applications ==
Fluff pulps are used as a raw material in the absorbent core of personal care products such as diapers, feminine hygiene products, air-laid absorbent towelling, as such, or with superabsorbents and/or synthetic fibres. More than 80% of the pulps are used in baby diapers.

The most demanding application of fluff pulps is in air-laid products, used in serving utensils, various towel applications in homes, in the industry, and in hospitals. Fluff pulp for air-laid products is defibrized in a hammermill. Defibration is the process of freeing the fibres from each other before entering the paper machine. Important parameters for dry defibration are shredding energy and knot content.
