= Southern bleached softwood kraft =

Southern bleached softwood kraft (SBSK) is a wood pulp mainly produced in the southern USA. The main raw materials are slash pine, longleaf pine, shortleaf pine, loblolly pine and virginia pine.

== Properties ==
SBSK is produced from mixed fibre sources, but the main wood species of the pulp is dominating the properties. All have long fibres. Slash pine and longleaf pine have thick walled fibres and makes the pulp suitable for fluff pulp.

== Applications ==
SBSK is used in fluff pulp, tissue paper, filter paper and mercerised pulp. It is used as reinforcement fibres when making paper or as raw material for kraft paper.

== See also ==
Northern bleached softwood kraft
