= Wepa (company) =

German sanitary paper manufacturer

WEPA Hygieneprodukte GmbH
- Type: GmbH
- Industry: Sanitary paper production
- Founded: 1948
- Headquarters: Arnsberg, Germany, Germany
- Key people: Martin Krengel (CEO); Harm Bergmann-Kramer (COO); Ralph Dihlmann (CFO); Andreas Krengel (CCO)
- Revenue: over €1.7 billion (2024)
- Number of employees: ca. 4,300 (2025)
- Website: www.wepa.eu

The WEPA Group with its headquarters in Müschede near Arnsberg is a German family business for sanitary paper. With around 4,300 employees and a turnover of over €1.7 billion, WEPA is the third largest manufacturer of hygiene paper in Europe.

== History ==
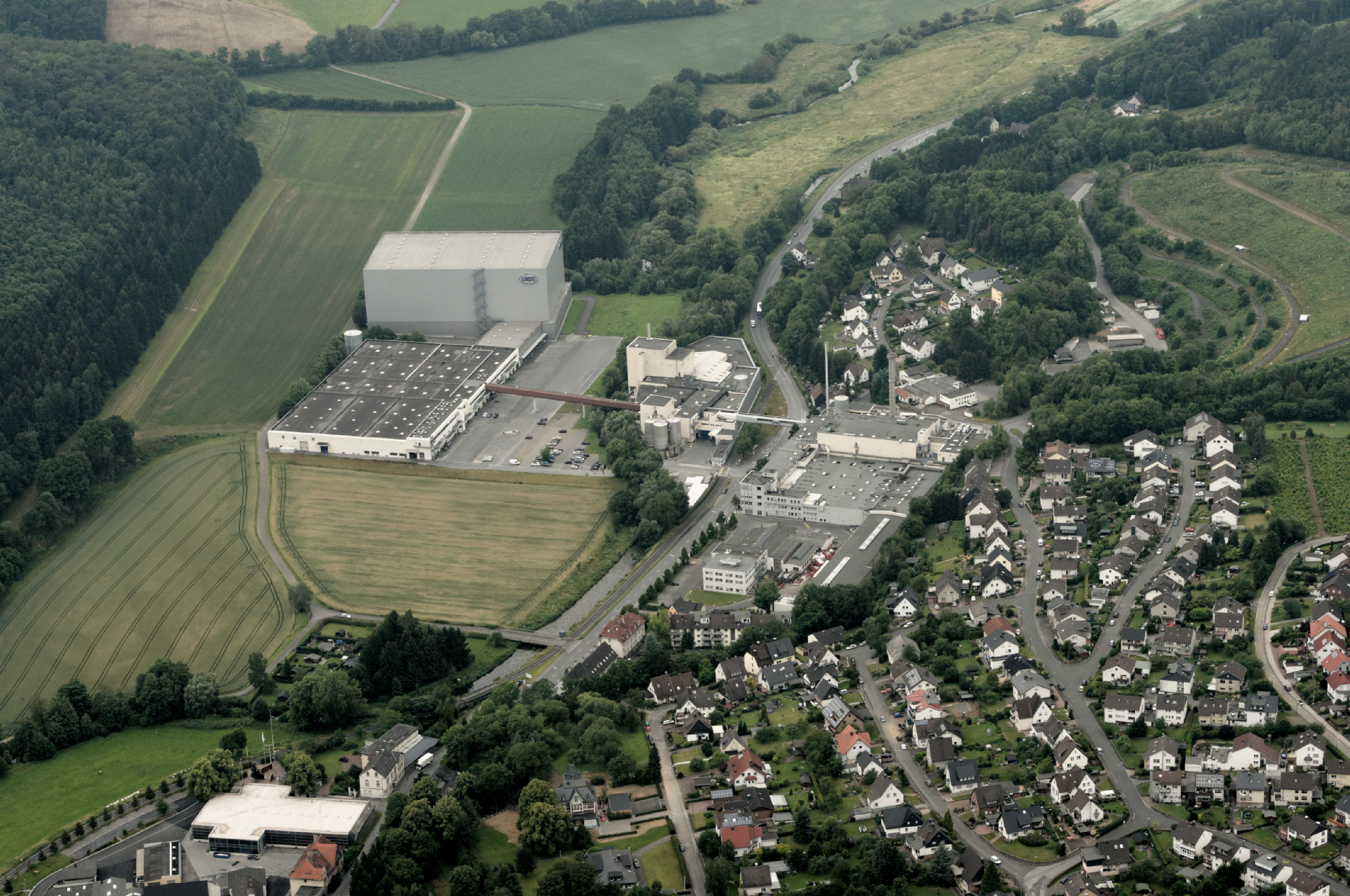
Headquarters in Arnsberg-Müschede

WEPA (Westfälische Papierfabrik) was founded in 1948 by Paul Krengel as a wholesale company for lining, wrapping, and gift wrap paper. It was not until 1953 that the processing of hygiene papers began in Arnsberg. In 1958, the company's own paper production began with the construction of the first paper machine for crepe paper in Müschede.

Construction of the plant in Marsberg-Giershagen in 1963 marked the beginning of further processing for the manufactured paper. In 1980, the company started to develop its first private labels, which have become a core field of activity of the company since then. During the 1970s and 1980s, Paul Krengel's four sons – Paul Jr., Wolfgang, Joachim and Martin Krengel – gradually joined the company and subsequently took over its management.

In 2001, WEPA took over Kriepa GmbH in Kriebethal (today WEPA Saxony), where a joint venture with the paper factory Kübler & Niethammer had already existed since 1990. Because WEPA products such as toilet paper occupy a large volume relative to their comparatively low price during transport, additional sites were established across Europe in order to keep transport distances short.

From 2004 onwards, the company expanded. WEPA consequently founded the joint venture GC & WEPA S.L. in Ejea de los Caballeros, Spain, and took over the majority shares of the Polish hygiene paper manufacturer Fabryka Papieru Piechowice SA (today WEPA Piechowice) and the Mainz mill of Kimberly-Clark. Beginning in 2008, the dependences of Italian competitor Kartogroup in Italy (Lucca and Cassino), Germany (Leuna) and France (Lille) were also integrated into the WEPA Group. As Kartogroup was almost as large as WEPA and was insolvent, the acquisition was regarded as rather risky, particularly as the global financial crisis occurred during this period. Against this background, a cooperation with the investment company Pamplona Capital was entered into in 2010, but this was terminated shortly thereafter due to differing views on corporate governance. Even without investment capital, the integration of Kartogroup subsequently succeeded.

In 2015, WEPA sold its shares in the Spanish joint venture and bought a further site in Troyes, France. Two years later, with the takeover of the family business Van Houtem, a site in Swalmen, Netherlands, for the manufacture of away-from-home products was incorporated.

In 2018, WEPA took over all shares of the joint venture UK Northwood & WEPA LTD (now WEPA UK), which was founded in 2014 in Bridgend.

In 2019, WEPA expanded its locations with the acquisition of the Greenfield plant in Château-Thierry, France. WEPA Greenfield only produces recycled fibres (DIP) cleaned of printing ink. WEPA is therefore represented with thirteen locations in six European countries. During the COVID-19 pandemic from spring 2020 onwards, demand for toilet paper increased and production was temporarily standardised to a basic product, allowing the machines to run without programme changes and enabling the company to meet the high demand.

Since 2021, Andreas Krengel has been part of the management alongside his father, Martin Krengel. During the global energy crisis around 2022, production was partially suspended for the first time in the company's history due to high energy prices.

In 2023, the business unit WEPA Professional acquired the family-owned company Star Tissue UK, a British supplier of hygiene paper products based in Blackburn, Lancashire (now WEPA Professional UK Ltd).

Since 2025, WEPA has been investing in a new paper machine, two new converting lines, and a modernisation of palletising at the site in Bridgend in Wales.

== Company structure and production sites ==
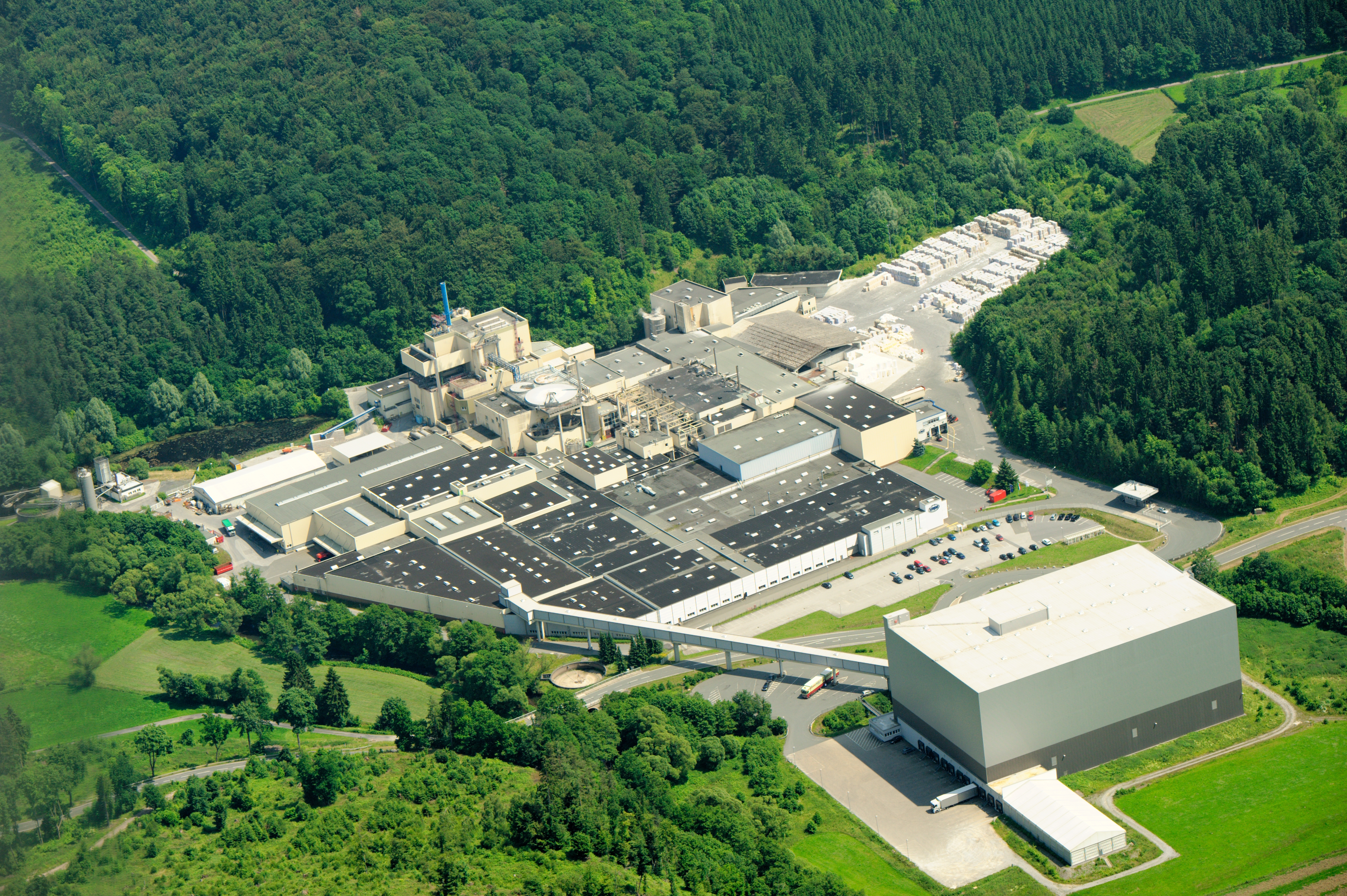
Plant Marsberg-Giershagen

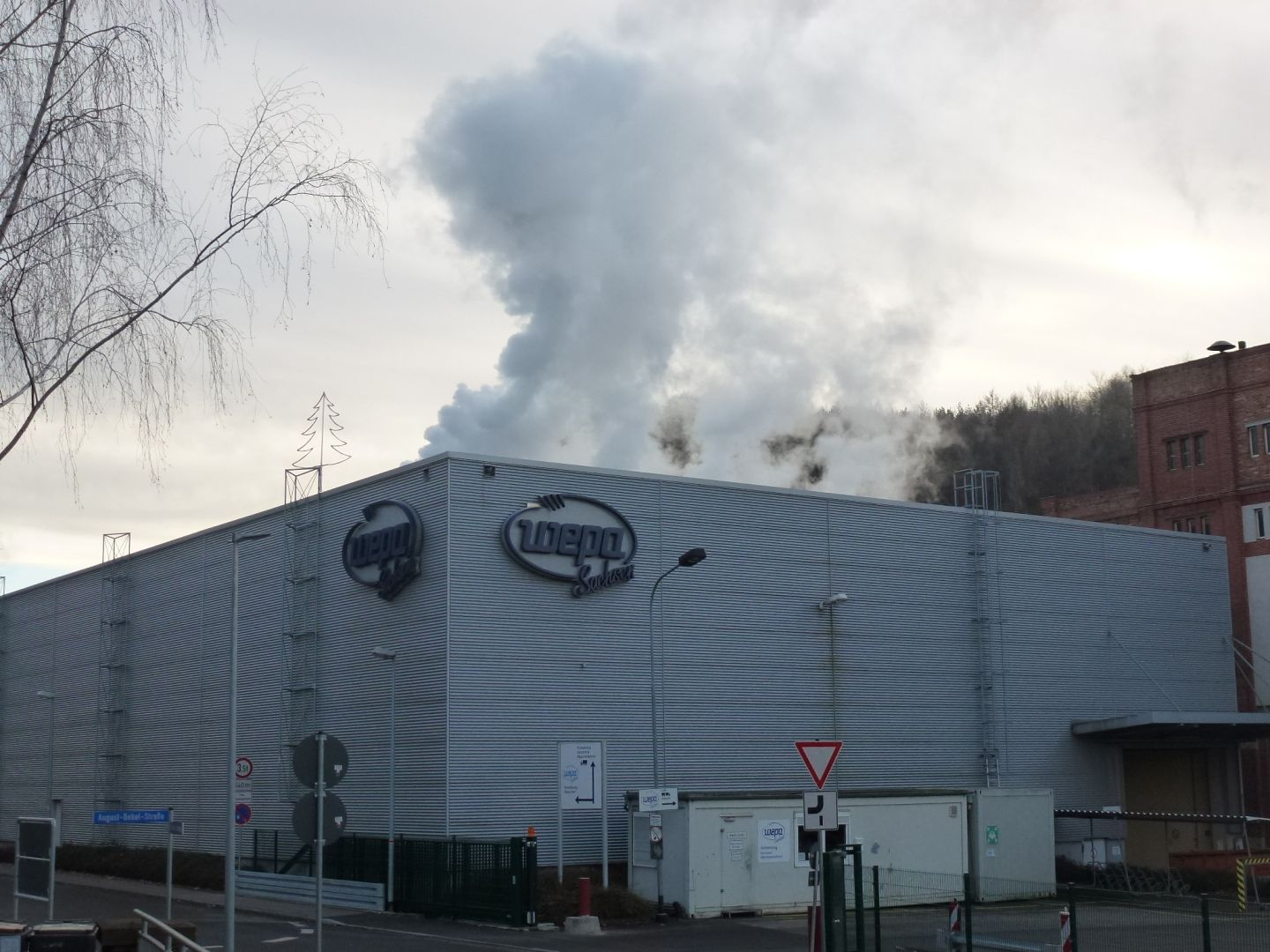
Production facility Kriebstein

The WEPA Group consists of a number of companies, with WEPA SE acting as the parent company for around 20 national and international subsidiaries. The headquarters, as well as a large part of the administration of the WEPA Group, is located in Müschede, Arnsberg. The company is owned by the Krengel family. Through the so-called WEPA Academy, the company offers, among other things, professional training courses and language courses for its employees.

As of 2025, WEPA operates 14 production sites in six European countries at the following locations:

- Arnsberg-Müschede, North Rhine-Westphalia, Germany
- Marsberg-Giershagen, North Rhine-Westphalia, Germany
- Kriebstein-Kriebethal, Saxony, Germany
- Leuna, Saxony-Anhalt, Germany
- Mainz, Rhineland-Palatinate, Germany
- Lille, France
- Troyes, France
- Château-Thierry, France
- Bridgend, United Kingdom
- Blackburn, United Kingdom
- Cassino, Italy
- Lucca, Italy
- Swalmen, Netherlands
- Piechowice, Poland

== Products and brands ==
The WEPA Group manufactures various types of hygiene paper for the grocery retail sector and specialist trade; in addition, the WEPA Group offers dispenser systems and washroom equipment. As of 2020, toilet paper accounts for the largest share of revenue. According to figures from 2023, the company holds a 25% market share in Germany and an 8% share in Europe in the hygiene paper segment. Its 22 paper machines provide a production capacity of 850,000 tonnes, which are processed into the various forms of hygiene paper on more than 80 converting machines, including toilet paper, tissues, cosmetic tissues, paper towels, napkins and industrial rolls at more than 90 automatic converting machines.

WEPA primarily markets its hygiene paper products in the consumer segment as private-label brands to the European grocery retail sector. In addition to these private labels, WEPA also has its own brands in Europe, including in Germany the brands mach m!t, Snyce and Satino by Wepa. The WEPA Professional business unit, with the brand Satino, offers systems (such as hygiene paper and dispenser systems) that include services such as the collection of used paper hand towels for, for example, public washrooms, industry, offices and healthcare facilities. WEPA also offers recycled pulp as a semifinished product for industrial customers under the name Premium Recycled Pulp, which can be used, among other applications, for the packaging of dry food products.

== Sustainability ==
According to its own statements, WEPA exclusively uses recovered paper or fairly traded fibres for the production of its hygiene paper products. This includes recovered paper and certified pulp sourced from sustainable forestry. WEPA produces sustainable hygiene paper for private labels as well as products for their WEPA brands mach m!t and Satino PureSoft, the latter of which are made from 100% recovered paper. Since 2023, WEPA has been using a process in which old cardboard is converted into recycled paper, whereby the paper fibres undergo several life cycles.

WEPA operates a circular economy model in which used paper towels are collected and processed into new paper towels. WEPA has received sustainability awards, including the Bundespreis Ecodesign by the German Ministry for the Environment in 2023 and the German Sustainability Award in 2024.

== Social engagement ==
In 2021, the Krengel family established the Wepa Foundation, which supports initiatives and projects in the fields of hygiene, sustainability, lifelong learning, and family entrepreneurship. Andreas Krengel and Ingmar Lohman were appointed as Chairmen of the WEPA Foundation's Board. The WEPA Foundation also awards a sustainability prize. For the restoration of the Diemel river, located near the production centre in Marsberg-Giershagen, the company made part of its own land available.
