= Wrapping tissue =

Thin tissue paper for wrapping and cushioning items

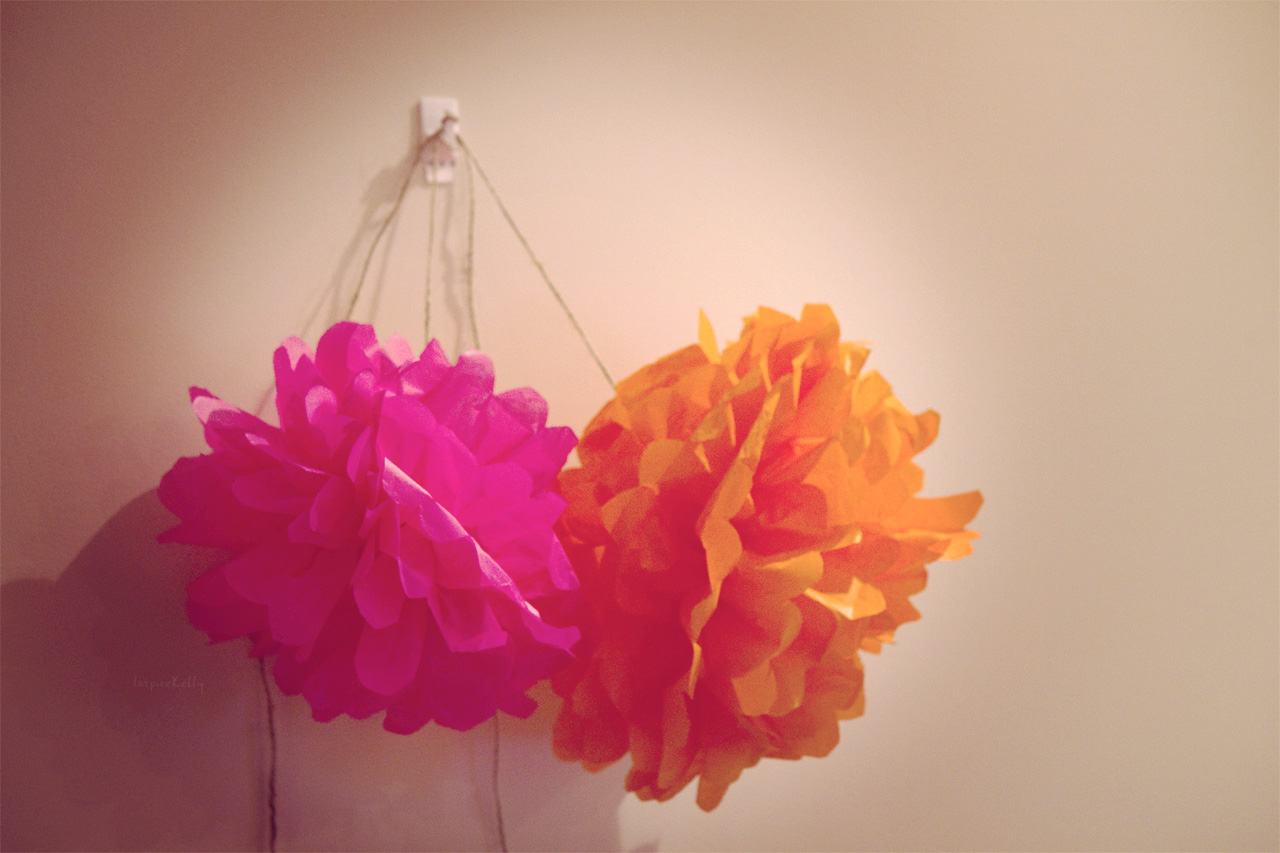
Flowers made of wrapping tissue

Wrapping tissue is a translucent, thin tissue paper used for wrapping and cushioning items.

Wrapping tissue is usually found in single sheets or sheet collections of 25, 40, or 50. White tissue is also sold specifically for bulk wrapping in reams of 480 sheets.

Some shops wrap delicate merchandise in folded or crumpled layers of tissue paper to protect it before placing it in bags or boxes for the purchaser.

Colored wrapping tissue can be used for an assortment of visually creative purposes. For example, when wet, the color bleeds a watercolor-like layer of tissue paper that stays when the tissue paper is peeled off. Tissue paper can be crumpled up to form objects, such as flowers.

Tissue paper was used by musicians in the early 1900s to play the comb, producing a sound similar to the kazoo. Jazz musician Red McKenzie was one of the best-known players.

For production wrapping tissue paper is made by the machine glaze process. A slurry of bleached wood pulp beaten together with soda ash and optical brighteners is placed on a forming wire where the water is allowed to drain away. The sheet is then pressed against a felt and pressed against a drying cylinder for the final drying step. The sheet is then pulled away from the dryer and wound up ready for further processes like calendering etc. or straightaway converting it into wrapping paper.

== See also ==
- Crêpe paper
- Tissue paper
- Yankee dryer
- Wove paper
