= Air-laid paper =

Nonwoven fabric

Air-laid paper is a textile-like material categorized as a nonwoven fabric made from fluff pulp.

== Properties ==
Compared with normal wet-laid paper and tissue, air-laid paper is very bulky, porous and soft. It has good water absorption properties and is much stronger compared with normal tissue.

Main characteristics are:

- Soft, does not scratch.
- Non-linting, no dust, no static.
- Strong, even when wet, can be rinsed and reused.
- Clean, hygienic, can be sterilized.
- Textile-like surface and drape.
- Can be dyed, printed, embossed, coated and made solvent resistant.

== Manufacture ==
Unlike the normal papermaking process, air-laid paper does not use water as the carrying medium for the fibre. Fibres are carried and formed to the structure of paper by air. The air-laid structure is isotropic.

The raw material is long fibered softwood fluff pulp in roll form. The pulp are defibrized in a hammermill. Defibration is the process of freeing the fibres from each other before entering the papermachine. Important parameters for dry defibration are shredding energy and knot content. Normally an air-laid paper consists of about 85% fibre. A binder must be applied as a spray or foam. Alternatively, additional fibres or powders can be added to the pulp which can then be activated and cured by heat.

== History ==
The Danish inventor Karl Krøyer is considered to be the first who commercialized air-formed paper in the early 1980s. Others developed different processes independently at about the same time. A Finnish company United Paper Mills(now UPM-Kymmene Oyj) was one of the companies developing airlaid technology in the 1980s. In the 1980s UPM formed a new company called Walkisoft Oy and also built an airlaid factory to Kotka Finland which started in 1985. Walkisoft built several plants around the world (including the world's largest airlaid-factory in Mt Holly, NC, USA) in the following 14 years before being sold to Buckeye Technologies Inc. The Walkisoft engineering team, which was responsible for the engineering and R&D of the airlaid machines, became known as Buckeye Engineering Finland and then, from 2002, as Anpap Oy, a private owned Finnish company.

== Applications ==
- Disposable diapers as part of the inner absorbent
- Feminine hygiene
- Industrial wipes
- Personal care products
- Table top
  - napkin
  - tablecloth
- Wet wipes
