= List of largest producing countries of agricultural commodities =

Production and consumption of agricultural plant commodities has a diverse geographical distribution. Along with climate and corresponding types of vegetation, the economy of a nation also influences the level of agricultural production. Production of some products is highly concentrated in a few countries, China, the leading producer of wheat and ramie in 2013, produces 95% of the world's ramie fiber but only 17% of the world's wheat. Products with more evenly distributed production see more frequent changes in the ranking of top producers. The major agricultural products can be broadly categorised into foods, fibers, fuels, and raw materials.

== Produce types ==
=== Cereal ===
Source: Food and Agriculture Organization of the United Nations (2024)

Cereal	First	Second	Third
Barley	Russia	Australia	France
Buckwheat	Russia	China	Ukraine
Canary seed	Canada	Argentina	Thailand
Fonio	Guinea	Nigeria	Mali
Maize	United States	China	Brazil
Millet	India	Niger	China
Oat	Russia	Canada	Poland
Quinoa	Peru	Bolivia	Ecuador
Rice	India	China	Bangladesh
Rye	Germany	Poland	Russia
Sorghum	United States	Nigeria	Mexico
Soybean	Brazil	United States	Argentina
Triticale	Poland	Germany	France
Wheat	China	India	Russia

=== Vegetables ===
Source: Food and Agriculture Organization of the United Nations (2024)

Vegetable	First	Second	Third
Artichokes	Egypt	Italy	Spain
Asparagus	China	Peru	Mexico
Broad beans and horse beans, green	Algeria	China	Tunisia
Cabbages	China	India	Russia
Carrots and turnips	China	Uzbekistan	India
Cauliflowers and broccoli	China	India	United States
Chillies and peppers, green	China	India	Mexico
Cucumbers and gherkins	China	India	Turkey
Eggplants	China	India	Egypt
Green corn	United States	Mexico	Croatia
Green garlic	China	India	Egypt
Leeks and other alliaceous vegetables	Indonesia	France	Turkey
Lettuce and chicory	China	United States	India
Mushrooms and truffles	China	Japan	India
Okra	India	Nigeria	Dominican Republic
Onions and shallots, dry	India	China	United States
Onions and shallots, green	China	Mali	Angola
Other beans, green	China	India	Indonesia
Other vegetables, fresh n.e.c.	China	India	Vietnam
Peas, green	China	India	Pakistan
Potatoes	China	India	Ukraine
Pumpkins, squash and gourds	India	China	Egypt
Spinach	China	United States	Turkey
String beans	United States	Morocco	Philippines
Sugar beet	Russia	Germany	United States
Tomatoes	China	India	Turkey

=== Fruits ===
Source: Food and Agriculture Organization of the United Nations (2024)

Fruit	First	Second	Third	Fourth	Fifth
Apricot	Turkey	Uzbekistan	Iran	Tajikistan	Italy
Olive	Spain	Turkey	Italy	Portugal	Greece
Pear	China	Argentina	Turkey	United States	South Africa
Banana	India	China	Indonesia	Ecuador	Brazil
Mango, mangosteen, guava	India	Indonesia	China	Mexico	Pakistan
Coconut	Indonesia	Philippines	India	Brazil	Vietnam
Fig	Turkey	Egypt	Algeria	Morocco	Iran
Grape	China	Italy	France	United States	Spain
Orange	Brazil	China	Mexico	Egypt	India
Papaya	India	Dominican Republic	Indonesia	Mexico	Brazil
Peach and Nectarine	China	Spain	Turkey	Italy	United States
Apple	China	United States	Turkey	Poland	India
Pineapple	Costa Rica	Indonesia	Philippines	Brazil	China
Gooseberry	Russia	Ukraine	United Kingdom	Switzerland	Kyrgyzstan
Lemon and lime	India	Mexico	China	Argentina	Turkey
Raspberry	Russia	Mexico	Serbia	Poland	United States
Plum and sloe	China	Romania	Chile	Serbia	Turkey
Strawberry	China	United States	Egypt	Mexico	Turkey
Blueberry	United States	Peru	Canada	Chile	Mexico
Kiwifruit	China	New Zealand	Italy	Greece	Iran
Currant	Russia	Poland	Ukraine	United Kingdom	France
Date	Saudi Arabia	Egypt	Algeria	Iran	Pakistan
Cherry	Turkey	Chile	United States	Uzbekistan	Iran
Avocado	Mexico	Colombia	Dominican Republic	Indonesia	Peru
Quince	Turkey	China	Uzbekistan	Iran	Morocco
Watermelon	China	India	Turkey	Algeria	Brazil

=== Dairy ===
Source: Food and Agriculture Organization of the United Nations (2024)

Product	First	Second	Third	Fourth	Fifth
Milk (cow)	India	United States	China	Brazil	Germany
Milk (buffalo)	India	Pakistan	China	Nepal	Egypt
Milk (goat)	India	Sudan	Pakistan	Bangladesh	France
Milk (sheep)	China	Greece	Turkey	Syria	Algeria
Milk (camel)	Kenya	Somalia	Pakistan	Mali	Ethiopia

=== Drinks ===
Source: Food and Agriculture Organization of the United Nations (2024)

Product	First	Second	Third	Fourth	Fifth
Milk	India	United States	China	Brazil	Germany
Tea	China	India	Kenya	Sri Lanka	Turkey
Coffee	Brazil	Vietnam	Indonesia	Colombia	Ethiopia
Wine	France	Italy	Spain	United States	China
Beer	China	United States	Brazil	Mexico	Germany

=== Meat ===
Source: Food and Agriculture Organization of the United Nations (2024)

Product	First	Second	Third	Fourth	Fifth
Camel	Sudan	Saudi Arabia	Kenya	Somalia	United Arab Emirates
Chicken	United States	China	Brazil	Russia	India
Beef	United States	Brazil	China	Argentina	Australia
Buffalo	India	Pakistan	China	Egypt	Nepal
Horse	China	Kazakhstan	Mexico	Mongolia	Russia
Pork	China	United States	Brazil	Spain	Russia
Sheep	China	India	Australia	Turkey	New Zealand
Rabbit	China	North Korea	Egypt	Spain	France
Goat	China	India	Pakistan	Nigeria	Bangladesh
Goose	China	Taiwan	Madagascar	Egypt	Myanmar
Turkey	United States	Germany	Poland	France	Italy
Duck	China	Vietnam	France	Taiwan	Thailand
Other meat of mammals	Russia	China	India	Democratic Republic of the Congo	Ghana
Game	Papua New Guinea	United States	Nigeria	Ivory Coast	Ethiopia
Pigeon	Egypt	Namibia	Saudi Arabia	Syria	Myanmar

=== Nuts ===
Source: Food and Agriculture Organization of the United Nations (2024)

Nut	First	Second	Third
Almond	United States	Australia	Spain
Areca nut	India	Bangladesh	Myanmar
Brazil nut	Brazil	Bolivia	Peru
Cashew	Ivory Coast	India	Tanzania
Chestnut	China	Spain	Bolivia
Hazelnut	Turkey	Italy	United States
Peanut	China	India	Nigeria
Pistachio	United States	Iran	Turkey
Walnut	China	United States	Iran

=== Spices ===
Source: Food and Agriculture Organization of the United Nations (2024)

Spice	First	Second	Third	Fourth	Fifth
Black pepper	Vietnam	Brazil	India	Burkina Faso	Indonesia
Chili pepper	India	China	Thailand	Ethiopia	Bangladesh
Cinnamon (canella)	China	Vietnam	Indonesia	Sri Lanka	Madagascar
Cloves	Indonesia	Madagascar	Tanzania	Comoros	Sri Lanka
Ginger	India	Nigeria	China	Nepal	Indonesia
Nutmeg, mace, cardamom	Guatemala	India	Indonesia	Laos	Nepal
Vanilla	Madagascar	Indonesia	Mexico	Papua New Guinea	China
Garlic	China	India	Egypt	Bangladesh	South Korea

=== Others ===
Source: Food and Agriculture Organization of the United Nations (2024)

Product	First	Second	Third	Fourth	Fifth
Caviar	China	Russia	Italy	France	Poland
Cheese	United States	Germany	France	Italy	Netherlands
Cocoa	Ivory Coast	Indonesia	Ghana	Ecuador	Nigeria
Yerba mate	Argentina	Brazil	Paraguay	Burundi	Ethiopia
Hen Eggs, in shell	India	Indonesia	United States	Brazil	Mexico
Egg, other birds, in shell	Bangladesh	China	Indonesia	Brazil	Philippines
Honey	China	India	Turkey	Iran	Ethiopia
Olive oil	Spain	Italy	Turkey	Greece	Tunisia
Tobacco	China	India	Brazil	Indonesia	Zimbabwe
Sugarcane	Brazil	India	China	Thailand	Pakistan

== Non-food products ==
=== Fibers ===
Source: Food and Agriculture Organization of the United Nations (2024)

Fiber	First	Second	Third	Fourth	Fifth
Abaca (manila)	Philippines	Ecuador	Costa Rica	Indonesia	Equatorial Guinea
Agave fibre	Colombia	Mexico	Ecuador	Philippines	Cuba
Bast fibre	India	Russia	China	Cuba	Chile
Cotton	China	India	Brazil	United States	Pakistan
Flax	France	Belgium	Belarus	China	Russia
Jute	Bangladesh	India	Cambodia	Uzbekistan	China
Kapok	Indonesia	Thailand	India		
Ramie	China	Laos	Philippines	South Korea	Japan
Rubber	Thailand	Indonesia	Ivory Coast	Vietnam	China
Silk	China	India	Uzbekistan	Vietnam	North Korea
Sisal	Brazil	Tanzania	Kenya	Madagascar	China
Wool	China	Australia	New Zealand	Turkey	United Kingdom

=== Forest products ===
Source: Food and Agriculture Organization of the United Nations (2024)

Wood and forest products	First	Second	Third	Fourth	Fifth
Wood fuel^{1}	India	China	Brazil	Ethiopia	Democratic Republic of the Congo
Sawnwood^{2}	United States	China	Russia	Canada	India
Wood-based panels^{3}	China	United States	Russia	India	Brazil
Paper and Paperboard^{4}	China	United States	Japan	India	Germany
Dissolving wood pulp^{5}	Indonesia	Brazil	China	United States	South Africa

^{1}Wood fuel includes all wood for fuel as firewood, wood pellets, and charcoal
^{2}Sawnwood includes all sawn wood, dimensional lumber
^{3}Wood-based panel includes all plywood, particleboard, fiberboard and veneer sheets
^{4}Paper and Paperboard includes all paper, sanitary paper, and packaging materials
^{5}Dissolving wood pulp includes cellulose extracted from wood for making synthetic fibres, cellulose plastic materials, lacquers and explosives
