= Mercerised pulp =

Mercerised pulp is a bleached pulp that is treated with hot diluted alkali to get extra high bulk and high porosity. The pulp feels and looks similar to a cotton ball.

== Manufacture ==
Mercerising of pulp is a post treatment of fully bleached pulp normally of SBSK. The pulp is steeped in hot dilute caustic soda. The pulp fibres swell and the hydroxyl groups of the cellulose become crosslinked. The remaining hemicellulose is washed out and the pulp will subsequently not respond to refining.

== Applications ==
- Filter paper
- Non-wovens

== See also ==
- Mercerised cotton
