= Filter paper =

Semi-permeable paper barrier

Filter paper is a semi-permeable paper barrier placed perpendicular to a liquid or air flow. It is used to separate fine solid particles from liquids or gases.

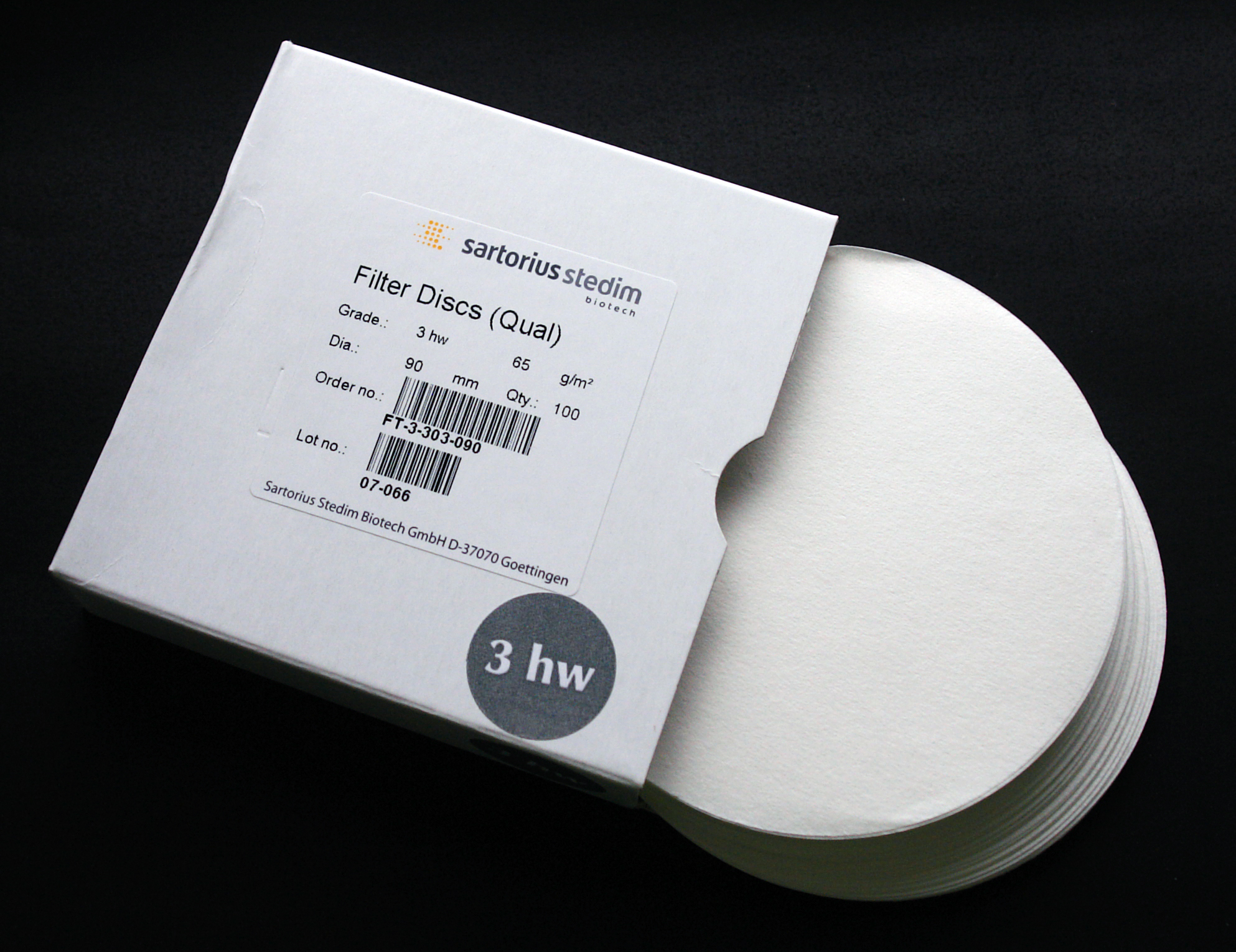
Filter paper: used for separating solid from liquid.

The raw materials are typically different paper pulps. The pulp may be made from softwood, hardwood, fiber crops, or mineral fibers.

== Properties ==
Filter paper has various properties. The important parameters are wet strength, porosity, particle retention, volumetric flow rate, compatibility, efficiency and capacity.

There are two mechanisms of filtration with paper; volume, and surface. By volume filtration, the particles are caught in the bulk of the filter paper. By surface filtration, the particles are caught on the paper surface. Filter paper is mostly used because of the ability of a small piece of filter paper to absorb a significant volume of liquid.

== Manufacture ==
The raw materials are different paper pulps. The pulp may be from softwood, hardwood, fiber crops, mineral fibers. For high quality filters, dissolving pulp and mercerised pulp are used. Most filter papers are made using small paper machines. For laboratory filters, the machines may be as small as 50 cm in width. The paper is often crêped to improve porosity. The filter papers may also be treated with reagents or impregnation to get the right properties.

== Types ==
=== Air filters ===
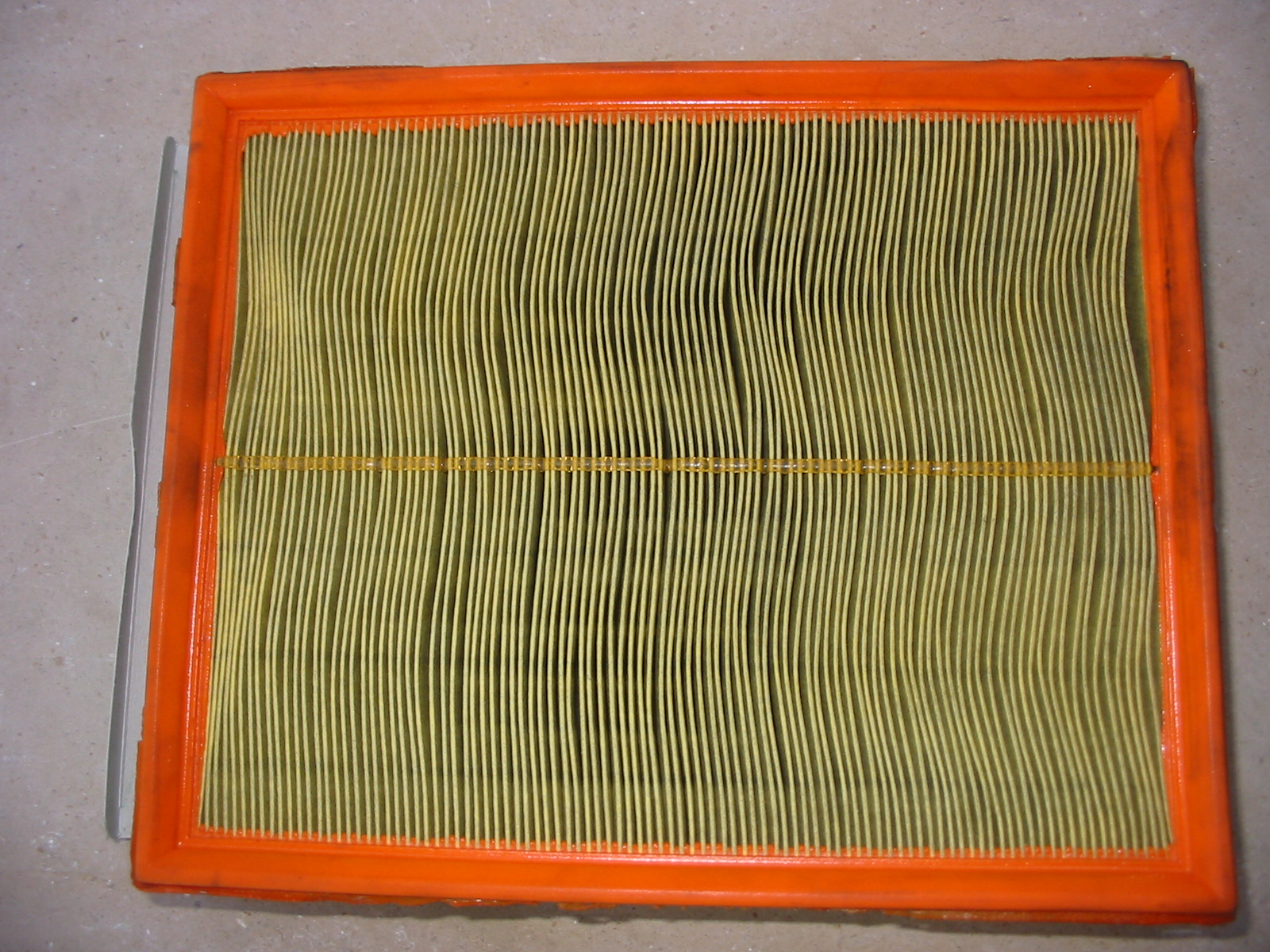
Air filter paper in an auto engine

The main application for air filters are combustion air to engines. The filter papers are transformed into filter cartridges, which then is fitted to a holder. The construction of the cartridges mostly requires that the paper is stiff enough to be self-supporting. A paper for air filters needs to be very porous and have a weight of 100–200 g/m^{2}. Normally particularly long fibrous pulp that is mercerised is used to get these properties. The paper is normally impregnated to improve the resistance to moisture. Some heavy duty qualities are made to be rinsed and thereby extend the life of the filter.

=== Coffee and tea ===
Historically, blotting paper or cloth were used to extract filter coffee.

Modern coffee filters of paper are made from about 100 g/m^{2} crêped paper. The crêping allows the coffee to flow freely between the filter and the filtration funnel. The raw materials (pulp) for the filter paper are coarse long fiber, often from fast growing trees. For example, Melitta uses up to 60% of bambus in their filters since 1998. Both bleached and unbleached qualities are made. Coffee filters are made in different shapes and sizes to fit into different holders. Most notable are the (paper) coffee filter systems introduced by Melitta (1908, 1932, 1936, 1965), Chemex (1941) and Hario (2004).

Important parameters are strength, compatibility, efficiency and capacity.

Tea bags also work as a kind of paper filter. They are made from abacá fibers, a very thin and long fiber manilla hemp. Often the paper is augmented with a minor portion of synthetic fibers. The bag paper is very porous and thin and has high wet strength.

=== Fuel filters ===
The paper used for fuel filters is a crêped paper with controlled porosity, which is pleated and wound to cartridges. The raw material for filter paper used in fuel filters are made of a mixture of hardwood and softwood fibres. The basis weight of the paper is 50–80 g/m^{2}.

=== Horizontal plate filters ===
Horizontal plate filter paper is commonly utilized in industrial processing. Filter paper typically is designed to fit the manufacturers specifications. Absolute micron retention can range from 1–100 microns but Diatomaceous earth is commonly used with filter paper to obtain sub-micron filtration. Activated carbon or other filter aids can be used with the filter paper to form a filter cake to achieve specific results. Filter paper can be impregnated with DE or activated carbon.

=== Oil filters ===
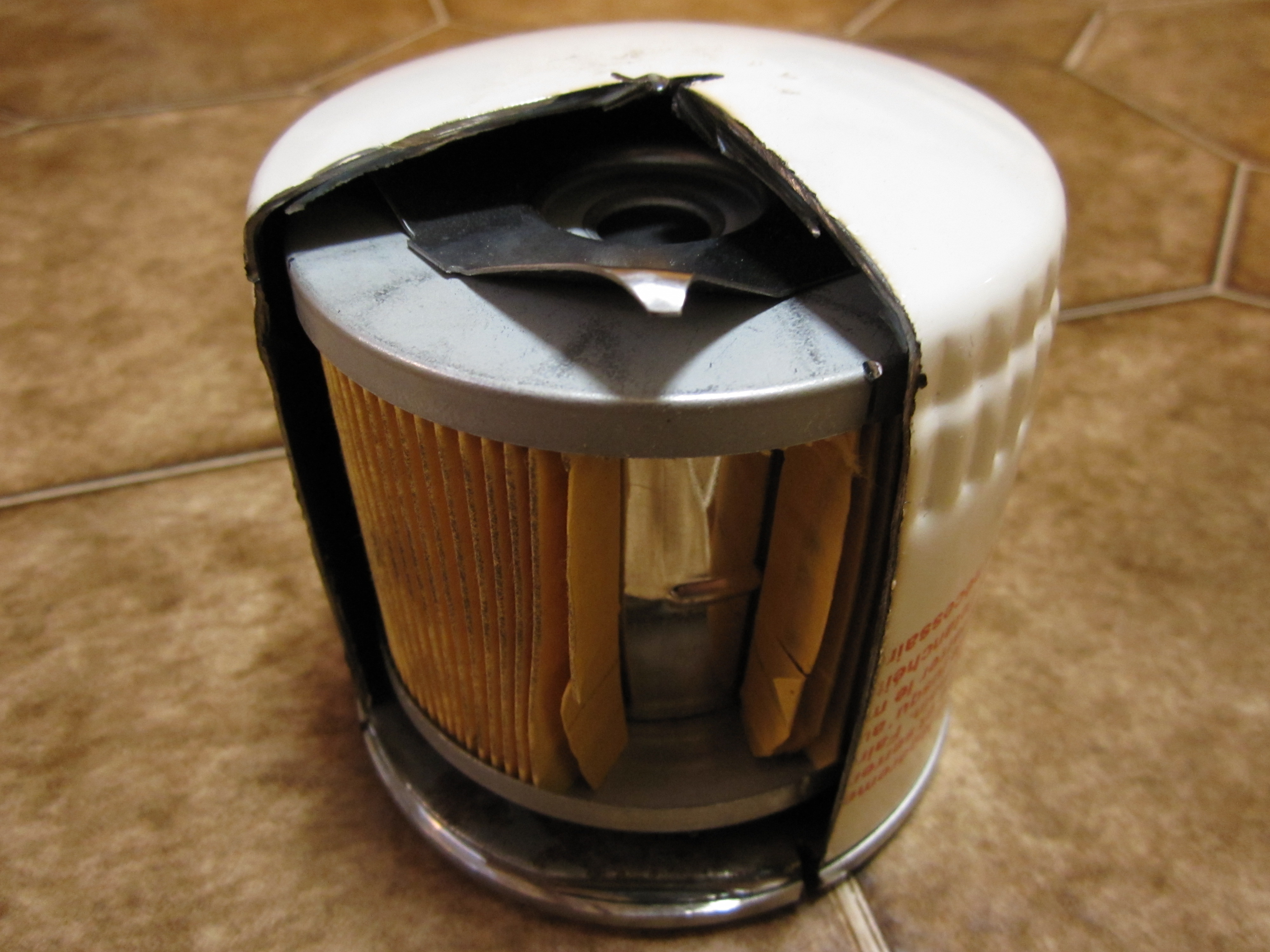
Oil filter cut-away with paper visible inside

Engine oil is filtered to remove impurities. Filtration of oil is normally done with volume filtration. Filter papers for lubrication oils are impregnated to resist high temperatures.

== Laboratory-grade paper filters ==
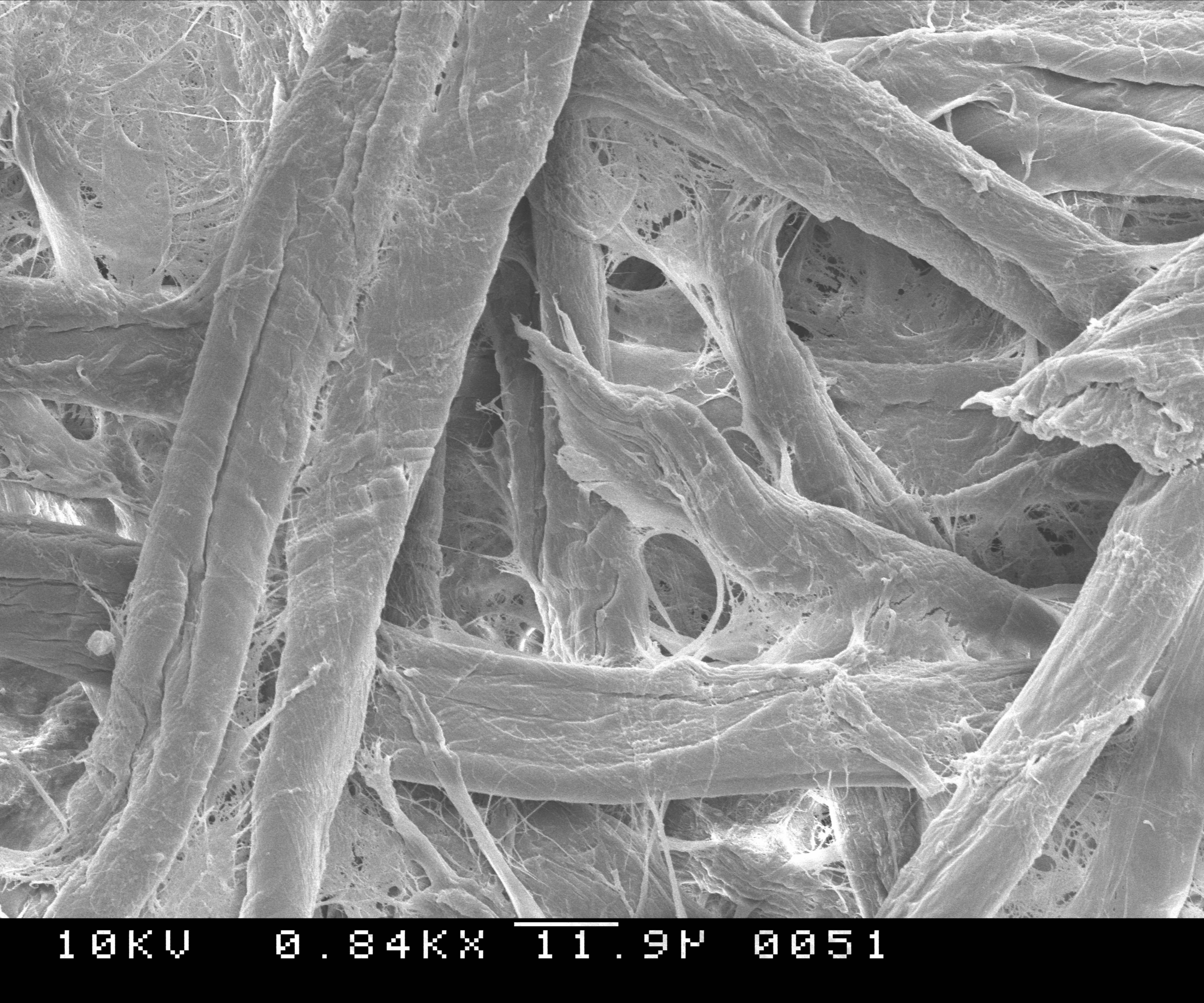
A scan of Whatman Filter Paper 4 Qualitative taken at 840 magnifications under a scanning electron microscope.

Filter papers are widely used in laboratory experiments across many different fields, from biology to chemistry. The type of filter used will differ according to the purpose of the procedure and the chemicals involved. Generally, filter papers are used with laboratory techniques such as gravity or vacuum filtration.

Historically, a type of soft, porous paper called charta emporetica was used in pharmacy as a filter and as packing paper.

=== Qualitative filter paper ===
Qualitative filter paper is used in qualitative analytical techniques to determine materials. There are different grades of qualitative filter paper according to different pore size. There are total 13 different grades of qualitative filter paper. The largest pore size is grade 4; the smallest pore size is grade 602 h; the most commonly used grades are grade 1 to grade 4.

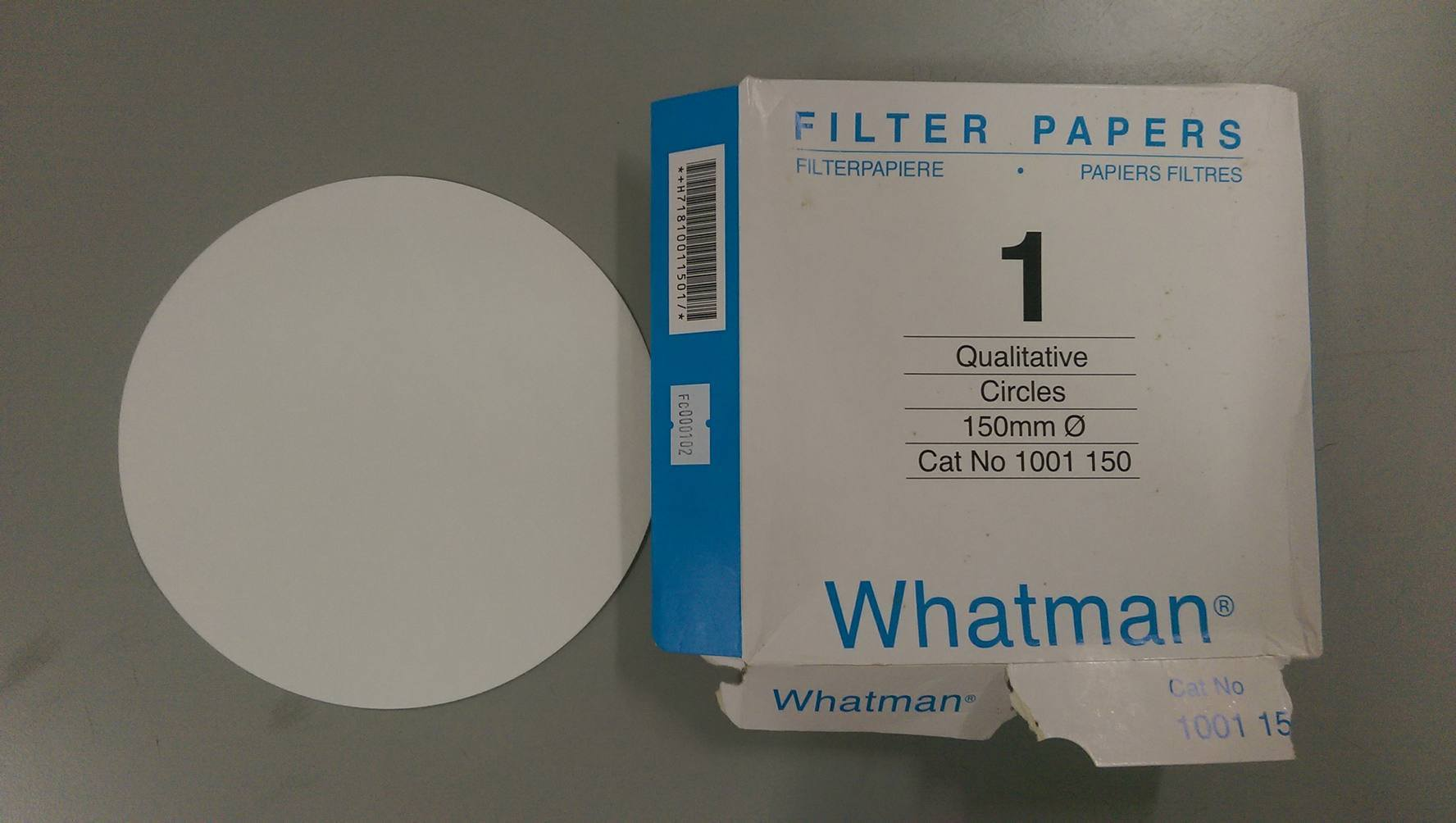
150mm qualitative filter paper

Grade 1
qualitative filter paper has the pore size of 11 μm. This grade of filter paper is widely used for many different fields in agricultural analysis, air pollution monitoring and other similar experiments.
Grade 2
qualitative filter paper has the pore size of 8 μm. This grade of filter paper requires more filtration time than Grade 1 filter paper. This filter paper is used for monitoring specific contaminants in the atmosphere and soil testing.
Grade 3
qualitative filter paper has the pore size of 6 μm. This grade of filter paper is very suitable for carrying samples after filtration.
Grade 4
qualitative filter paper has the pore size of 20~25 μm. This grade of filter paper has the largest pore size among all standard qualitative filter papers. It is very useful as rapid filter for cleanup of geological fluids or organic extracts during experiment.
Grade 602 h
qualitative filter paper has the pore size of 2 μm. This grade of filter paper has the smallest pore size among all standard qualitative filter papers. It is used for collecting or removing fine particles.

=== Quantitative filter paper ===
Quantitative filter paper, also called ash-free filter paper, is used for quantitative and gravimetric analysis. During the manufacturing, producers use acid to make the paper ash-less and achieve high purity.

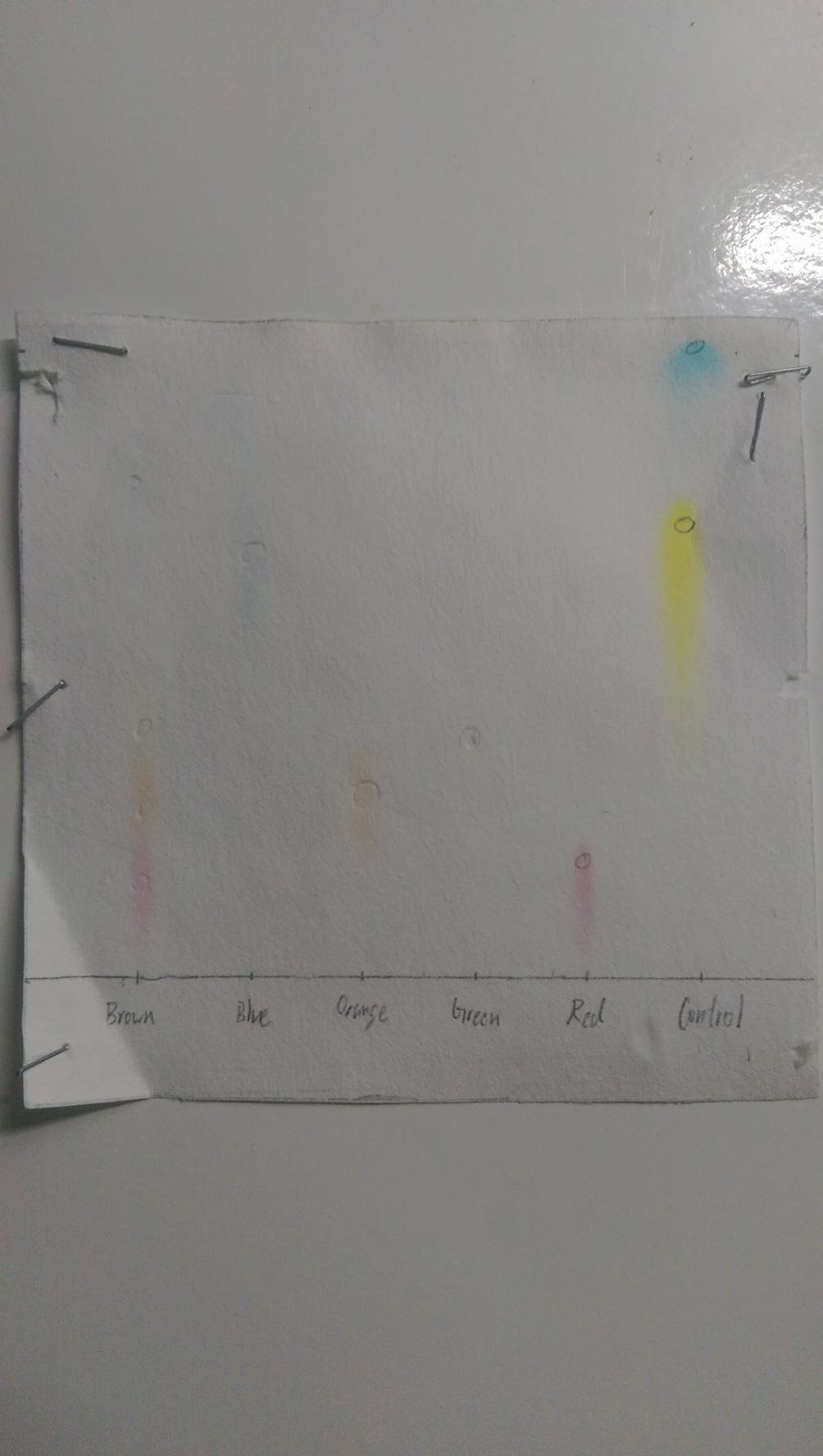
filter paper uses for paper chromatography

=== Chromatography papers ===
Chromatography is a method chemists use to separate compounds. This type of filter paper has specific water flow rate and absorption speed to maximize the result of paper chromatography. The absorption speed of this type of filter paper is from 6 cm to 18 cm and the thickness is from 0.17 mm from 0.93 mm.

=== Extraction thimbles ===
Extraction thimbles are rod-shape filter paper often used in soxhlet extractors or atomized extractors. It is ideal for very sensitive detection, the performance depends on the thickness of inner diameter. Also, it is usually used in areas of food control and environmental monitoring.

=== Glass fiber filters ===
Glass fiber filter has the pore size of 1 μm, it is useful for filtering highly contaminated solutions or difficult-to-filter solution. Also, glass fiber filter has extends filter life, wide range of particulate loads and can prevent sample contamination. In addition, different types of glass fiber filter are suitable for different filtration situation. There are 7 different types of glass fiber filters and the major difference is thickness.

=== Quartz fiber filter ===
Quartz fiber filter paper has a high resistance to chemicals, does not absorb NO_{x} and SO_{x} dioxides, is unaffected by humidity and is easily sterilized. Thus, it is mostly used for air pollution analysis.

=== PTFE filter ===
Polytetrafluoroethylene (PTFE) filter has wide operating temperature (−120 °C ~ 260 °C) with high air permeability. The resistance to high temperature makes PTFE filter paper suitable for use in autoclaves. It is often used to filter hot oils, strong solvents and collecting airborne particulates.

== See also ==
- Air purifier
- Filter
- Particulates, e.g., PM10
- Respirator
- Ulaxfilter
