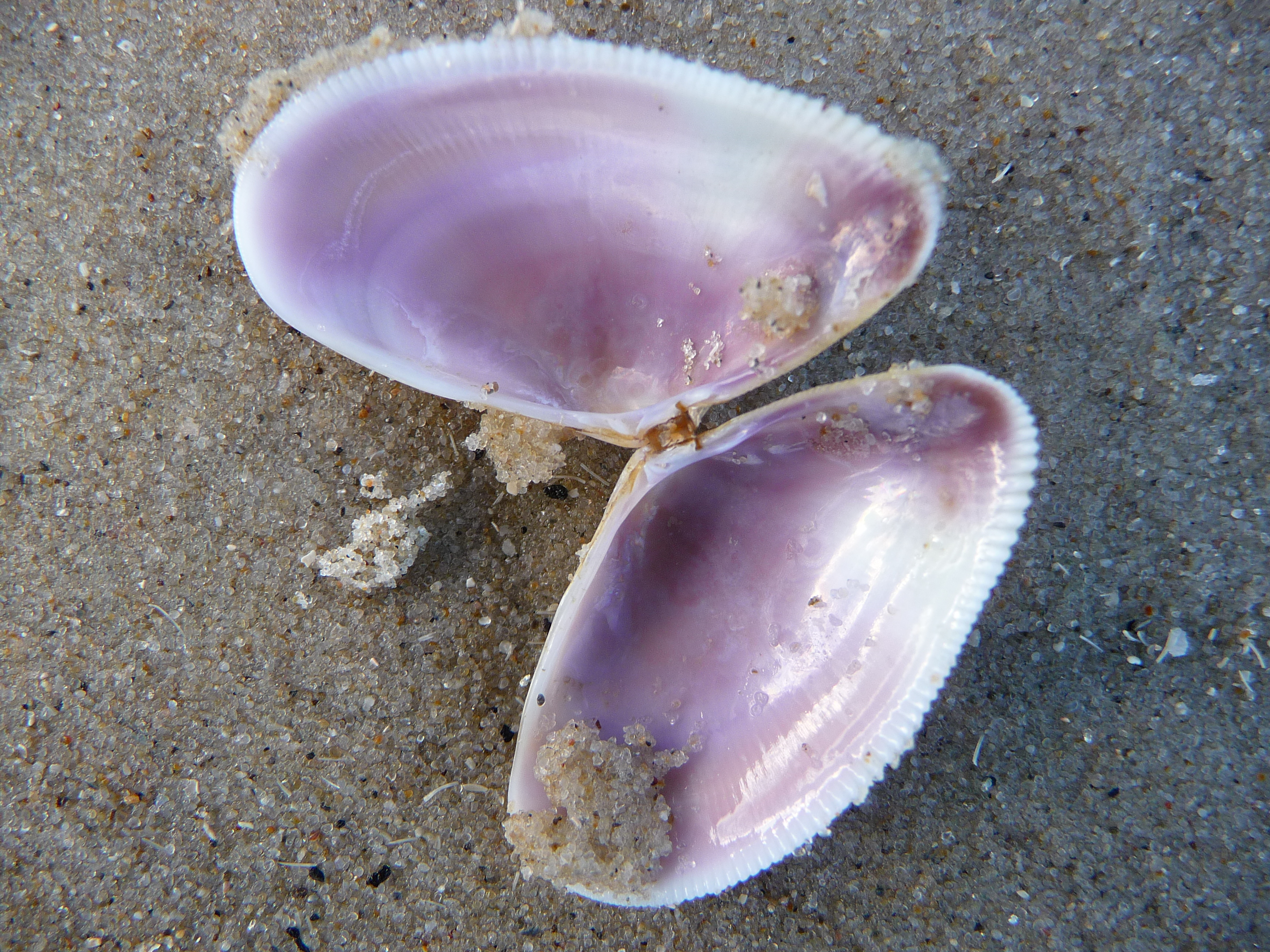
- Inside of empty shell

Scientific classification
- Kingdom: Animalia
- Phylum: Mollusca
- Class: Bivalvia
- Order: Cardiida
- Family: Donacidae
- Genus: Donax
- Species: D. vittatus

Binomial name
- Donax vittatus (da Costa, 1778)

= Donax vittatus =

Species of bivalve

Donax vittatus, or the banded wedge shell, is a species of bivalve mollusc in the order Cardiida. It is found on beaches in northwest Europe buried in the sand on the lower shore.

== Description ==
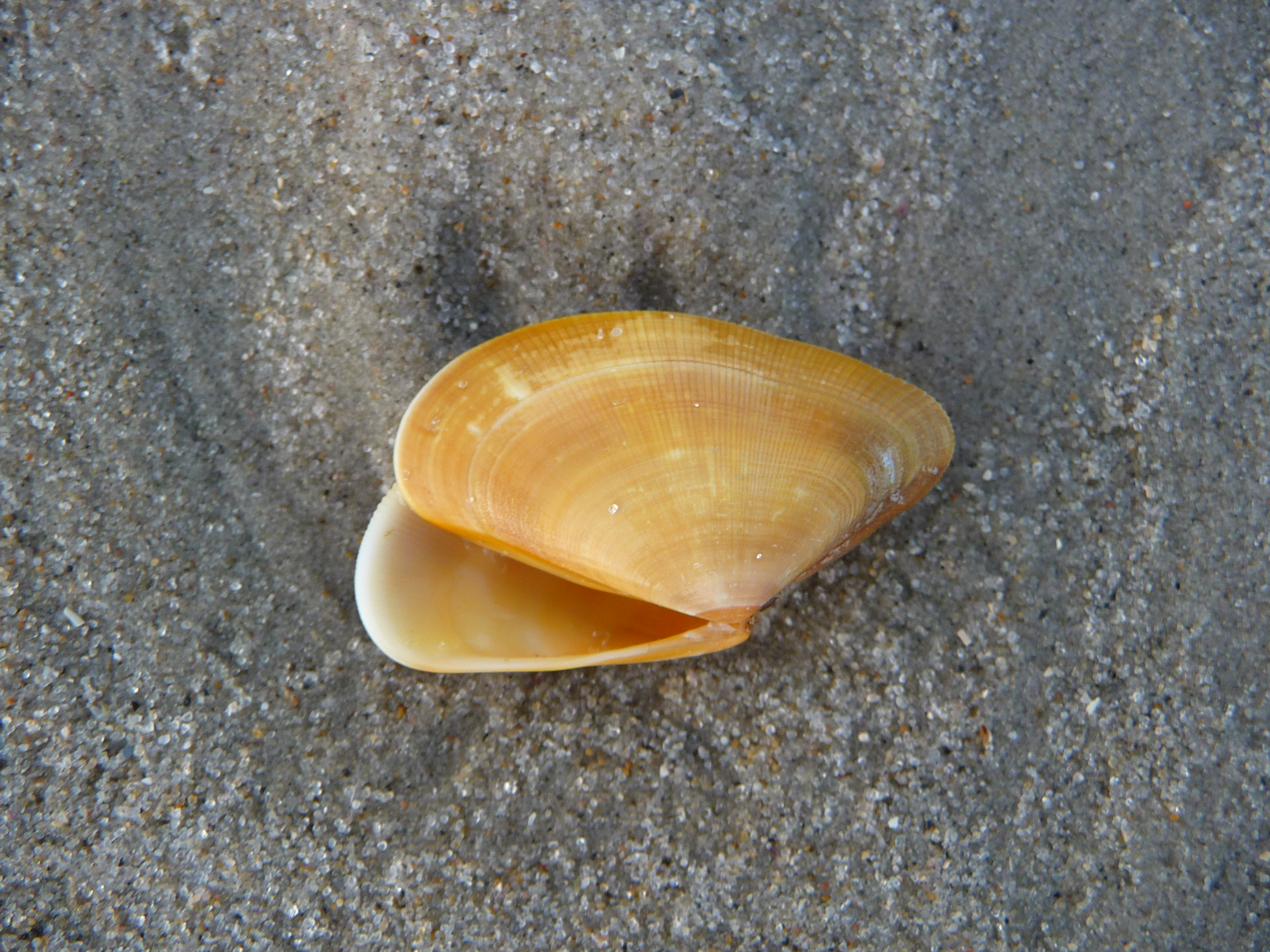
Empty shell of Donax vittatus.

The shells of Donax vittatus are laterally compressed and grow to 1.3 inches (33 mm) long and 0.6 inches (15 mm) wide. The valves are delicate and glossy and are found in a wide range of colours including white, yellow, brown, pink and violet. The interior is white, often blotched with violet. The valves are asymmetric and wedge shaped, the anterior end being rounded and longer than the obliquely truncated posterior end. They show a fine sculpturing of transverse and longitudinal grooves and the margin is finely serrated. The annual growth rings can be seen and these are often more deeply pigmented than the rest of the shell There may also be pale radial rays. On the inside of the shell, the muscle scars are indistinct and the oval pallial sinus extends to the middle of the valve. The right valve has two cardinal, one posterior and two lateral teeth. The left valve has two cardinal teeth flanked by one lateral tooth on each side. The fringed mantle and the strong muscular foot are mauve or reddish, and the pair of short, separate siphons are orange.

Right and left valve of the same specimen:

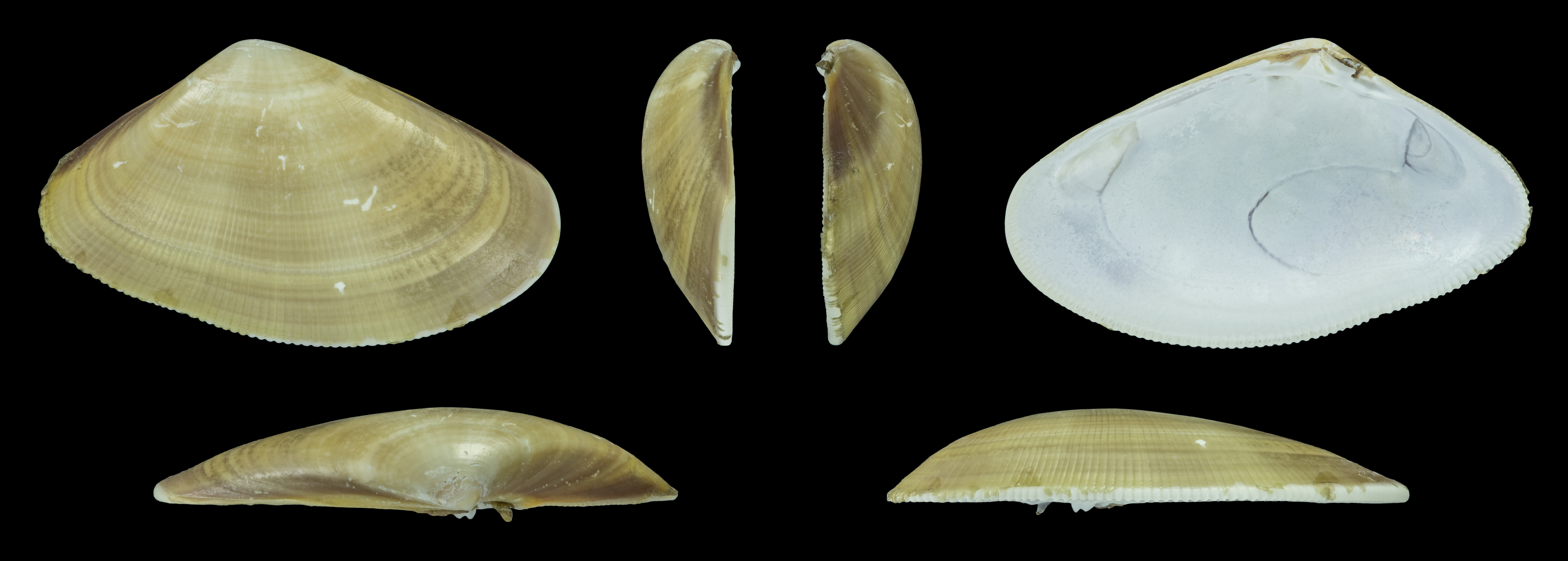
Right valve

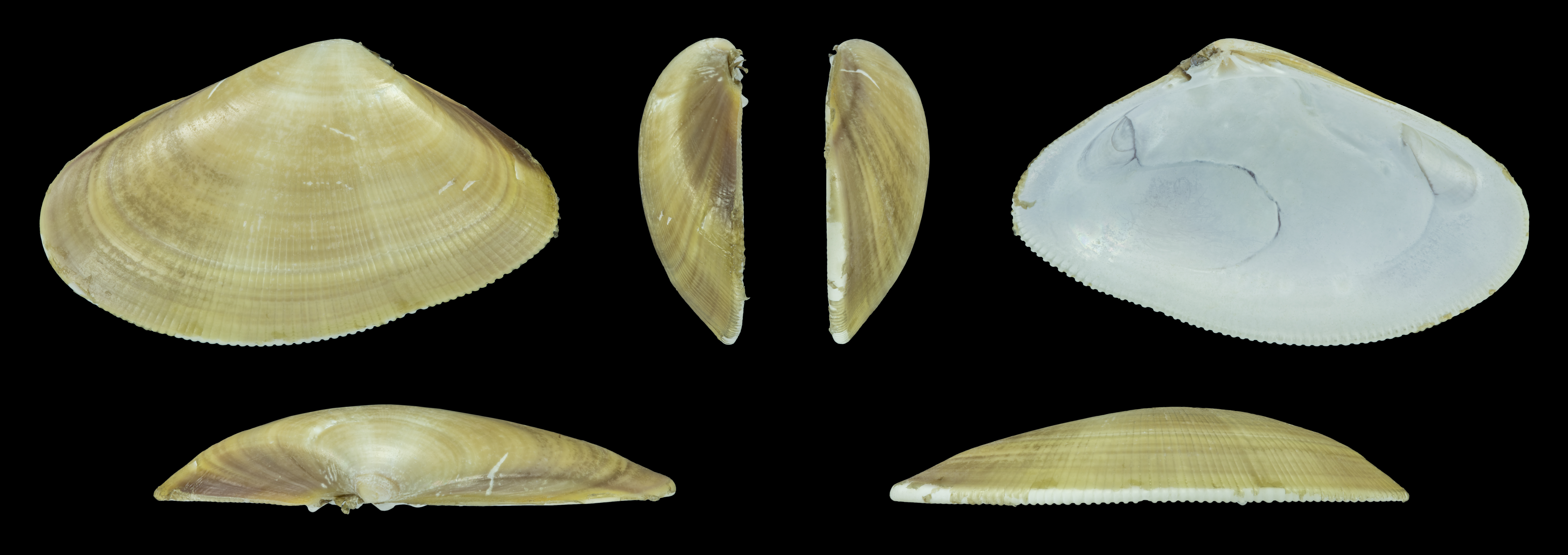
Left valve

== Distribution ==
Donax vittatus occurs in the Mediterranean Sea and the eastern Atlantic Ocean, from Norway and the Baltic Sea southwards to Spain and northwest Africa. It burrows in the sand on exposed beaches from the middle shore down to the shallow sublittoral. It is common in suitable habitats round the shores of the British Isles.

== Biology ==
Donax vittatus lives close to the surface of sandy beaches, extending its two siphons to the surface. When the tide is in, water is drawn in through one siphon and expelled through the other. Donax vittatus is a filter feeder and, at the same time that oxygen is being extracted from the water stream by the gills, food particles are captured and passed by cilia to the mouth. If the animal is disturbed or exposed by the scouring action of the waves, it can burrow rapidly. It does this by protruding its foot downwards, enlarging it by pumping blood into it and then using it as an anchor to pull itself deeper into the sand. Under water video-recording of Donax vittatus show that it is most active around the time of low water, when the sediment is most disturbed. Individuals were shown to "leap" and to be dragged around on the surface by wave currents before reburying themselves. At this time they are at risk of being eaten by gulls, and evidence that the birds consume large numbers of the shells is provided by the "gobbets" they sometimes leave on the beach, composed of the regurgitated inedible remnants of their meal and in which many broken shells of Donax vittatus can sometimes be found. Donax vittatus is also preyed on by starfish, various gastropod molluscs and fish such as flounders.

Donax vittatus is dioecious, individuals being either male or female. Spawning takes place over the course of the spring and summer. Fertilisation is external and the eggs hatch into veliger larvae which become part of the zooplankton. After about 3 weeks these develop into pediveliger larvae which settle and undergo metamorphosis. The juveniles grow fast and mature within a year.
