= Müschede =

- Stadtteil of Arnsberg
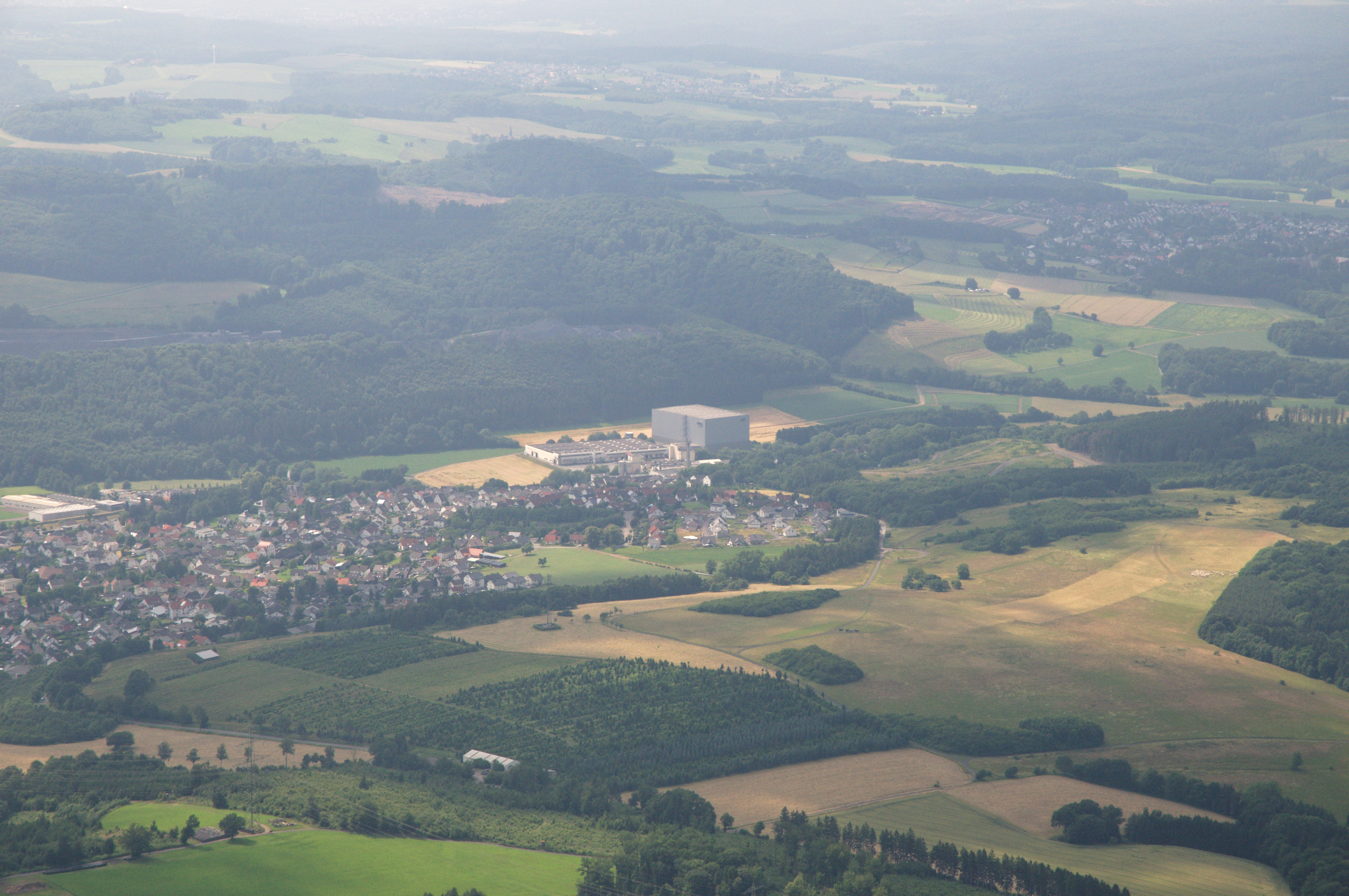

- Coat of arms
- Interactive map of Müschede
- Location within Germany Location within North Rhine-Westphalia
- Coordinates: 51°23′N 8°5′E
- Country: Germany
- State: North Rhine-Westphalia
- Admin. region: Arnsberg
- District: Hochsauerland
- Town: Arnsberg

Area
  - Total: 11.41 km^{2} (4.41 sq mi)
- Elevation: 221 m (725 ft)

Population (2014-12-31)
  - Total: 2,767
  - Density: 242.5/km^{2} (628.1/sq mi)
- Time zone: UTC+01:00 (CET)
  - Summer (DST): UTC+02:00 (CEST)

Müschede is a village in the city of Arnsberg in North Rhine-Westphalia, Germany.

== Geography ==
Müschede is located on the eastern slope of Röhrtals, between the villages Hüsten and Hachen. Opposite the town is "der Müssenberg," a 427.5-meter-tall (1,403 ft) mountain, the highest elevation in the city Arnsberg.

Between the Ruhr and the built-up area of Müschede is the site of the former military training area, which has evolved in recent years into a popular recreation area. With an area of 11.41 square kilometers, Müschede makes up about 5.6% of the total area of Arnsberg.
