= Yankee dryer =

Papermaking vessel

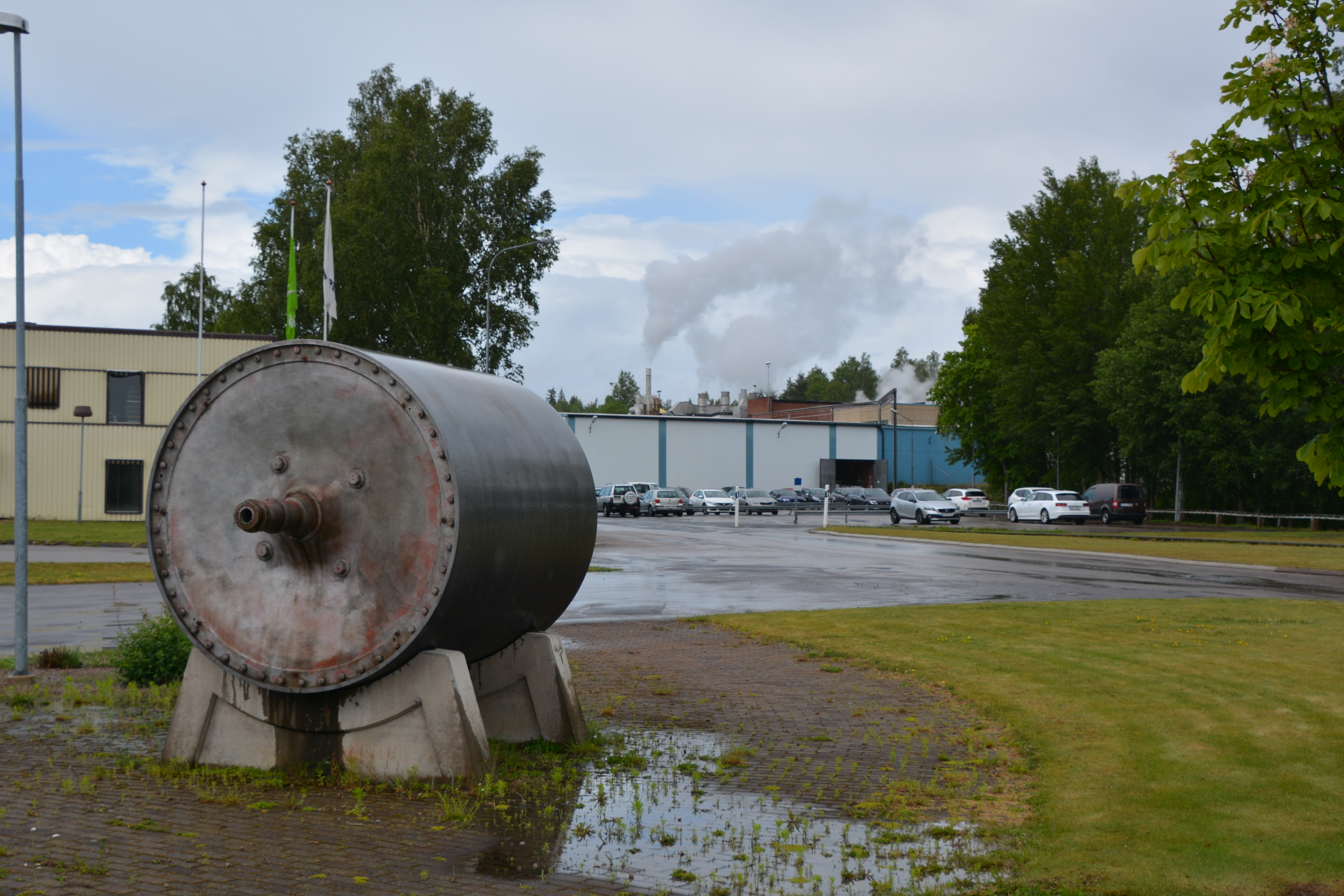
Old Yankee cylinder outside Pauliströms bruk in Sweden

A Yankee dryer is a pressure vessel used in the production of machine glazed (MG) and tissue paper. On the Yankee dryer, the paper goes from approximately 42–45% dryness to just over 89% dryness. In industry, MG cylinders or Yankee dryers are primarily used to remove excess moisture from pulp that is about to be converted into paper. The Yankee cylinder can be equipped with a doctor blade and sprayed with adhesives to make the paper stick. Creping is done by the Yankee's doctor blade scraping the dry paper off the cylinder surface thereby crêping the paper. The crinkle (crêping) is controlled by the strength of the adhesive, the geometry of the doctor blade, the speed difference between the yankee and final section of the paper machine, and the paper pulp's characteristics.

== Configuration ==
Whereas in other paper productions a series of drying cylinders is used, in tissue production only one cylinder (the yankee cylinder) dries the paper. This is due to the necessity of creping and made possible by the low grammage (gsm = gram per square meter) of the paper sheet for tissue products, which is in the range of 14-45 gsm. For the production of the higher gsm in this range, some machines are nevertheless provided with some (4-10) drying cylinders after the yankee. In this case one speaks of "wet creping", as the creping of the paper done on the yankee is not made on the fully dried paper and the drying is completed after the yankee cylinder.

Yankee cylinders are traditionally made of cast iron and have diameters up to 6 m, therefore much higher than conventional drying cylinders. The width is a bit larger than that of the paper: typical for tissue are paper machine widths 1,74m 2,32m and 2,70m and their multiples (usually nowadays the doubles of these values are typical). Therefore, yankees are very heavy (~100t) and difficult to cast. Since a couple of decades the production of yankees made of steel is gaining market and new machines are practically always nowadays equipped with a steel yankee, which is much lighter, easier to produce and to transport.

Due to the abrasive effect of the creping blade the surface of the yankee becomes irregular and rough. Therefore, periodically (with very varying frequency: from every 6 months to some years) cast iron yankees have to be ground or polished. This decreases the thickness of the shell, and since the yankee is a pressure vessel, also the maximum pressure which can be used for paper production. A way to avoid this declassing of pressure is to make a metallisation, i.e. to spray onto the surface a special Chrom-Nickel alloy, similar to a high alloyed stainless steel, which is then ground with the foreseen crown of the shell surface, leaving a coated thickness of ca. 0,7–1 mm. The metallised surface is then much more resistant to the abrasion and only a very mild polishing may be necessary ca. every 2 to 4 years. The thermal conductivity of the metallisation is a bit less than that of the original material, so that cast iron cylinders are metallised after some grindings of the shell, in order to gain, through thickness decrease, some conductivity which is then again lost with the metallisation. Steel yankees are instead always metallised since the beginning.

The big dimension generates a problem with the elimination of the condensate forming inside the cylinders, therefore all yankees use a system with blow through steam which than it is re-compressed by help of a thermocompressor (ejector). In the inner surface of the yankee circular grooves are present which accommodate small pipes (s.c. "straw pipes" or "straws") through which the mixture of steam and condensate is sucked by means of a pressure difference between the yankee and the tank collecting the condensate (separator). The straws are combined in racks and these go to typically 6 collectors which take the condensate-steam mixture towards the center of the cylinder from which then it is taken out into usual piping and brought to the separator. Here the condensate and the blow-through steam separate at a lower pressure than that inside the yankee. In order not to spoil the blow-through steam, a thermocompressor uses motive steam (at a pressure ca. the double of that in the yankee) in order to increase again the pressure of the blow through steam to the value of the yankee.

Yankee safety is an important issue and TAPPI has a committee (Yankee Dryer Safety Committee) dedicated to it. The sharper problems are present with cast iron yankee, being this material much more brittle than steel, making the yankee very sensitive to temperature differences. For example, a yankee which is receiving steam while it is not rotating may be damaged by the temperature difference of the bulk to the bottom of the cylinder where the condensate is present. Particular attention shall be taken in case of fire, as direct jets of cold water on the surface of the hot yankee may damage it. Some cases of exploded yankees due to these and other reasons are unfortunately present in the history of tissue production.

The usage of a chemical coating on the surface of the yankee is nowadays the rule. This is constituted by a mixture of usually 2 or more constituents:

- A base polymer (adhesive) based on polyamides or epichlorhydrine resins which coats the surface of the yankee with a polymer layer in which the creping blade works, instead of scratching the iron surface. The base coating usually also has adhesive properties and keeps the paper attached to the yankee surface until creping.
- A release agent based on mineral or vegetable oil or waxes which lubricates and improved the detaching of the paper from the surface
- Various modifiers, which may make the coating more soft or hard or improve the protective effect on the yankee

The coating is sprayed together with water in the space between the creping blade and the press through a spray bar with nozzles. Only the narrow space between this spray bar and the press is the one in which the water coming with the coating shall be evaporated and the polymer has to cure. For this reason, pre-cured polymers are increasingly used for the base coating.
