= Wet strength =

Measure of the strength of paper when wet

The wet strength of paper and paperboard is a measure of how well the web of fibers holding the paper together can resist a force of rupture when the paper is wet. Wet strength is routinely expressed as the ratio of wet to dry tensile force at break.

With combined board such as corrugated fiberboard or with laminations, wet strength also includes the ability to stay intact under humid or wet conditions. Wet strength adhesives are often needed.

== Mechanism ==
The cellulose fibreweb of paper is mainly held together by hydrogen bonds. These are dependent on physical contact between the fibres and can be broken by wetting of the fibres. The residual strength of a wetted paper can be less than 10% of the original strength.

Various techniques, such as refining of the pulp and wet pressing on the paper machine can be used to reduce the strength loss of the paper upon wetting. To improve the wet strength it is common to use chemicals. The use of chemicals can retain as much as 10% to 30% of the original dry strength of the paper. The wet strength chemicals may improve the dry strength of the paper as well.

A Japanese research team found that the effect of humidity on cardboard differs depending on how it is dispersed. Ultrasonic mist reduces the wet strength of cardboard more so than nano-mist.

== Wet strength chemicals ==
Wet strength chemicals improve the tensile properties of the paper both in wet and dry state by crosslinking the cellulose fibres with covalent bonds that do not break upon wetting.

Wet strength development should not be confused with sizing, the first representing the strength of the paper once wet, the latter being the speed and amount of water absorbed by the paper. Normal wet strength resins are: urea-formaldehyde (UF), melamine-formaldehyde (MF) and polyamide-epichlorohydrin (PAE).

Neutral sizing agents are alkylketene dimers (AKD) and alkenylsuccinic anhydride (ASA).

== Coatings ==
Sometimes wet strength can be obtained by curtain coating a polymer onto a paper or paperboard. Laminating a plastic film is also a method of providing wet strength.

== Applications ==
A wide range of paper materials are wet strengthened:

- Tissue paper
- Filter paper
- Liquid packaging board
- Paper bag
- Paper chemicals

== Environmental considerations ==
Recycling of wet strengthened paper requires higher intensity reworking conditions in the re-pulping process to break the fibre web. Some wet strength papers are not considered recyclable.
