= Hammermill =

Machine

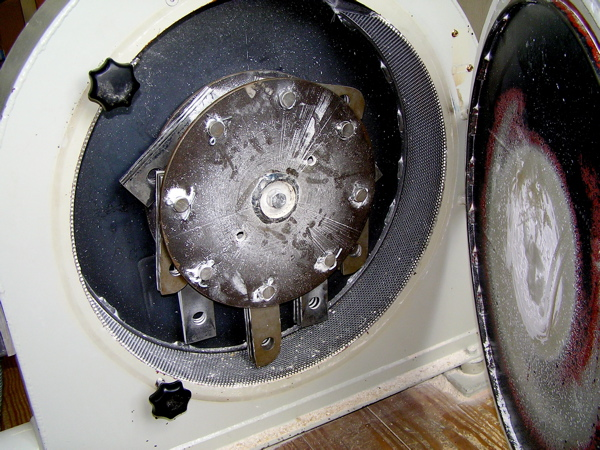
Hammermill for milling grain

A hammermill is a mill whose purpose is to shred or crush aggregate material into smaller pieces by the repeated blows of small hammers.

== Applications ==
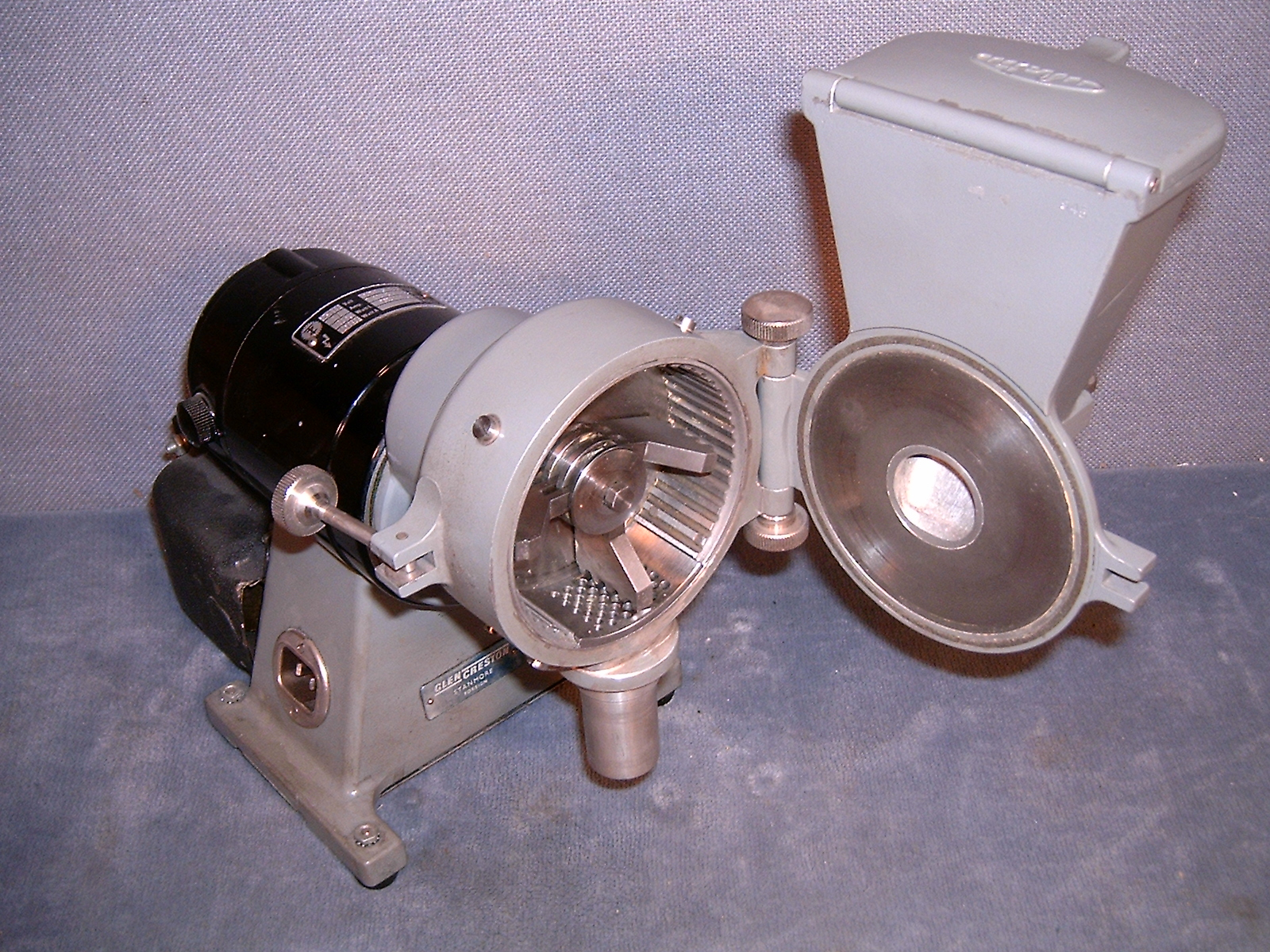
Desktop hammermill used for preparing growth media in a life sciences laboratory

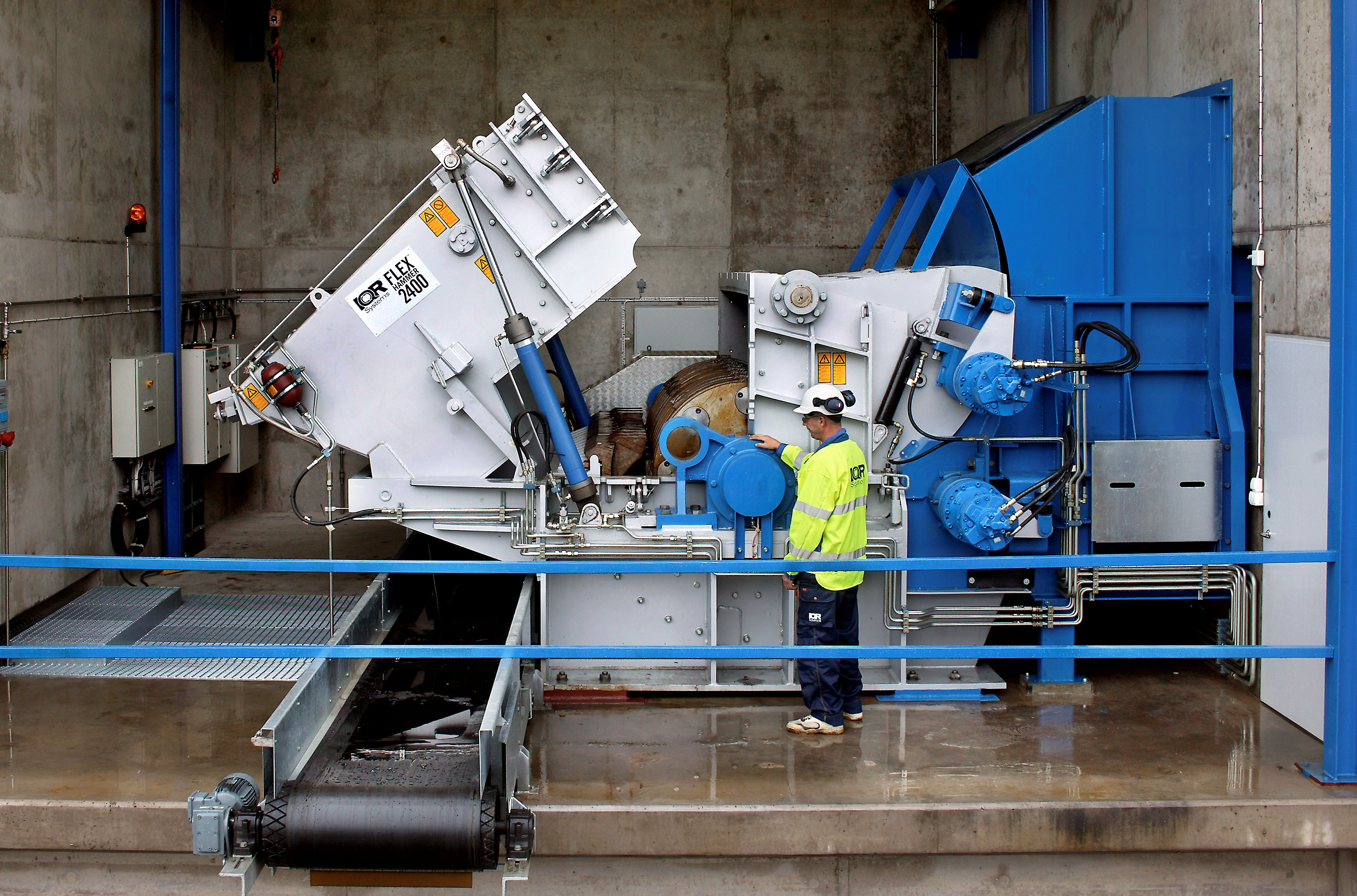
High speed industrial hammermill for waste fragmentation

Slow speed horizontal pallet grinder

Hammermills have numerous industrial applications, including:

- Ethanol plants
- A farm machine, which mills grain into coarse flour to be fed to livestock
- Fluff pulp defiberizing
- Fruit juice production
- Grinding used shipping pallets for mulch
- Milling grain
- Livestock, poultry, and aquatic feed production
- Sawmills, size reduction of trim scrap and planer shavings into boiler fuel or mulch
- Shredding paper
- Shredding scrap automobiles (see automotive shredder residue)
- Shredding yard and garden waste for composting
- Crushing large rocks
- In waste management

== Operation ==
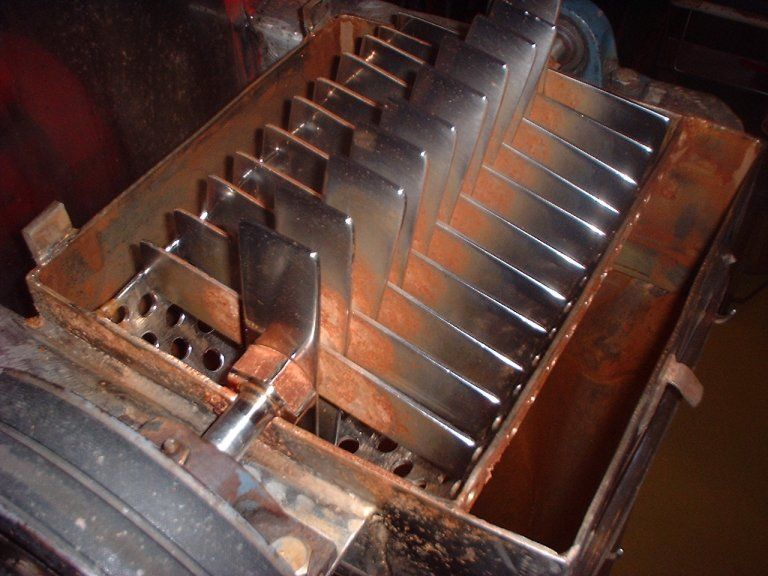
Hammermill apple shredder for juicing.

The basic principle is straightforward. A hammermill is essentially a steel drum containing a vertical or horizontal rotating shaft or drum on which hammers are mounted. The hammers are free to swing on the ends of the cross, or fixed to the central rotor. The rotor is spun at a high speed inside the drum while material is fed into a feed hopper. The material is impacted by the hammer bars and is thereby shredded and expelled through screens in the drum of a selected size.

The hammermill can be used as a primary, secondary, or tertiary crusher.

Small grain hammermills can be operated on household current. Large hammermills used in automobile shredders may be driven by diesel or electric motors ranging from 2000 to over 5000 horsepower (1.5 - 3.7MW).

The screenless hammer mill uses air flow to separate small particles from larger ones. It is designed to be more reliable, and is also claimed to be much cheaper and more energy efficient than regular hammermills. The design & structure of the hammermill is always determined by the end use.

== History ==
Water-powered trip hammermills were created in 488 AD by the medieval Chinese mathematician and engineer Zu Chongzhi which was inspected by Emperor Wu of Southern Qi (r. 482–493 AD). The water-powered trip hammermills were powered by minor hill flowing stream that was connected to a large river beneath the high banks.

== Types of hammermill crushers ==
Types of hammermill crushers can include up running and down running hammermills.

Up running
Uses perforated screens or grate bars to reduce soft or hard materials. The material to be reduced determines the rotor construction that can be adjustable based on wear.
Down running
Most suitable for fibrous materials due to the high concentration of shearing action within the unit.

Based on the director of the motor the hammermills are classified into the following types:

- Reversible hammermill
- Non-reversible hammermill

Although the mills are classified into the above two different types their working and grinding actions of both these types of mill are almost similar. However, their construction differs in various respects.

== See also ==
- Blade grinder
- Trip hammer, which may be housed in a mill usually known as a forge, but which was historically occasionally described as a "hammermill."
