= Crêpe paper =

Paper with a crinkled surface, resembling crêpe textiles

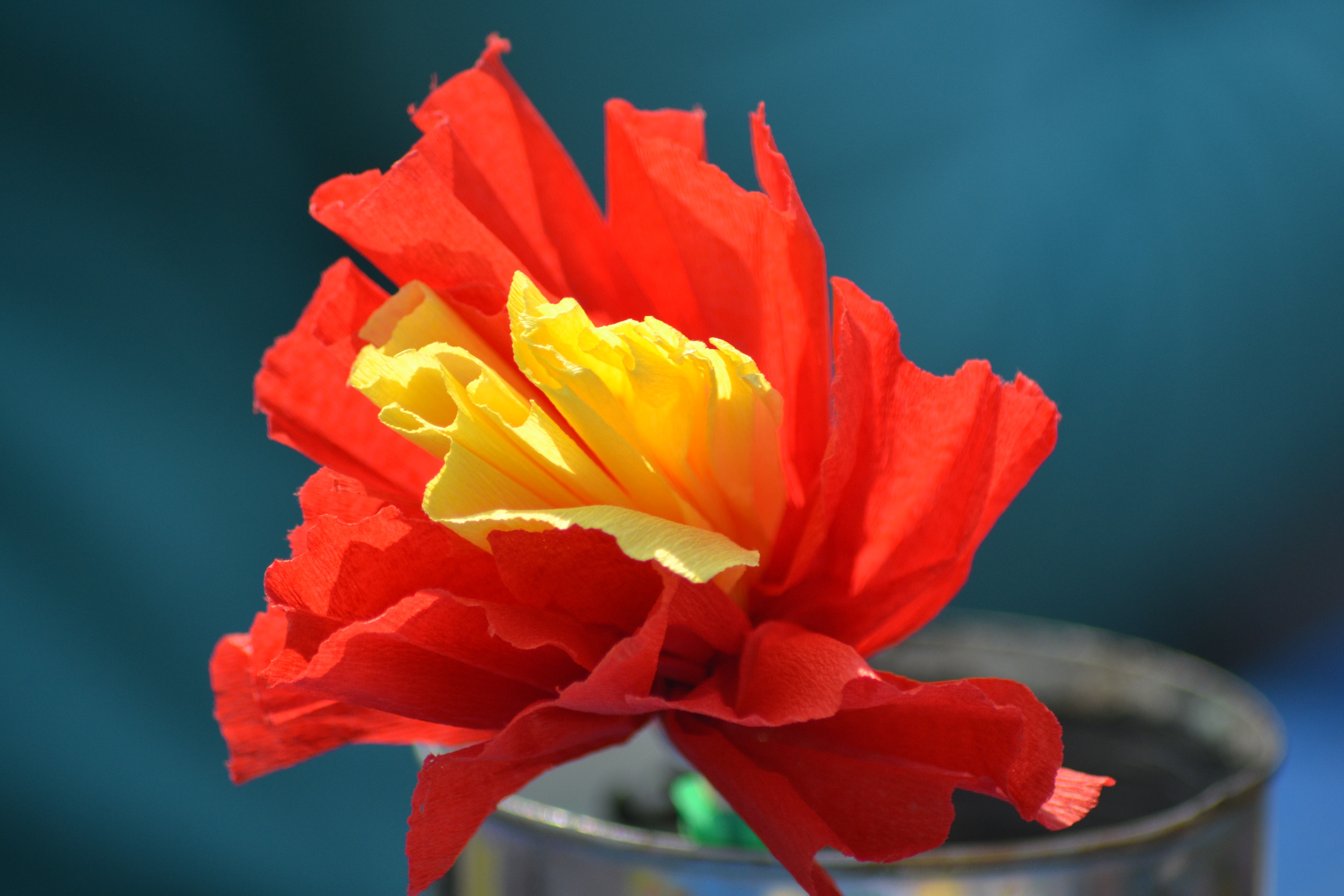
Crêpe paper

Crêpe paper is thin, textured, and often colorful decorative paper used in paper craft. It is created through the crêping process, which gathers in the paper and gives it crinkly texture like that of crêpe. Crêpe paper and tissue are among the lightest papers and are normally below 35 g/m^{2}. Crêpe paper has various applications, many of which are decorative.

== Description ==
Crêpe paper is thin, textured, and often colorful decorative paper used in paper craft. It is created by adhering wet tissue paper to the cylinder of a Yankee dryer and then scraping it off with a blade once dry. This process gathers in the paper, giving it a crinkly texture like that of crêpe. This creasing process is called creping or crêping.

== Production ==
Paper that is creped is produced on a paper machine that has a single large steam-heated drying cylinder (yankee) fitted with a hot-air hood. The raw material is paper pulp. The Yankee cylinder is sprayed with adhesives to make the paper stick. Crêping is done by the Yankee's doctor blade that scrapes the dry paper off the cylinder surface. The crinkle (crêping) is controlled by the strength of the adhesive, geometry of the doctor blade, speed difference between the yankee and final section of the paper machine and paper pulp characteristics.

== Properties ==
Crêpe paper and tissue are among the lightest papers and are normally below 35 g/m^{2}.

The crêpe ratio reflects how much the paper has shortened during crêping. The figure is normally between 10 – 30%. Crêping is used to adjust the paper's stretch and thickness, both of which have a marked effect on softness and absorbency.

== Applications ==
- Crêpe paper is popular for streamers and other party decorations.
- Props and costume accessories can be made of crêpe paper. It can be soaked in a small amount of water to create a dye for Easter eggs, white cardstock, and other materials.
- Crêpe paper can also be used to make paper flowers, appliqué, and paper sculpture.
- Crêpe paper is important as the backing for various types of tape, including masking tape and electrical tape.
- Used in recovery systems in small model rockets.
- Crêpe paper is one of the main components used in costume building for Junkanoo, the most popular street parade in the Bahamas.
- Crêpe paper can also be used as lipstick, lip tint and hair color.
- Crêping can also be applied to specialty papers, such as microcrêping in sack paper.

== See also ==
- Tissue paper
- Toilet paper
