= Sanitary paper =

Paper used for hygiene purposes

Sanitary paper includes papers used for toilet paper, sanitary napkins, facial tissues, paper towels, napkins and some disposable diapers. The paper is processed to be soft and absorbent.

Global production of the category in 2013 was 30.9 million tonnes, having steadily increased since 1993. Total production of these products has doubled between 1993 and 2013. Production is unevenly distributed throughout the world with the Americas producing about 40%, Asia 31%, and Europe 27%, but Africa and Oceania only 1% each. Of the leading countries, the USA produces 20%, China 13%, Japan 5%, and Italy 4%. Worldwide exports in 2013 accounted for 2.4 million tonnes and US$3.5 billion in value with Europe being the leading exporter (64%) and importer (58%).

== See also ==
- List of largest producing countries of agricultural commodities
