= Tissue paper =

Lightweight paper or, light crêpe paper

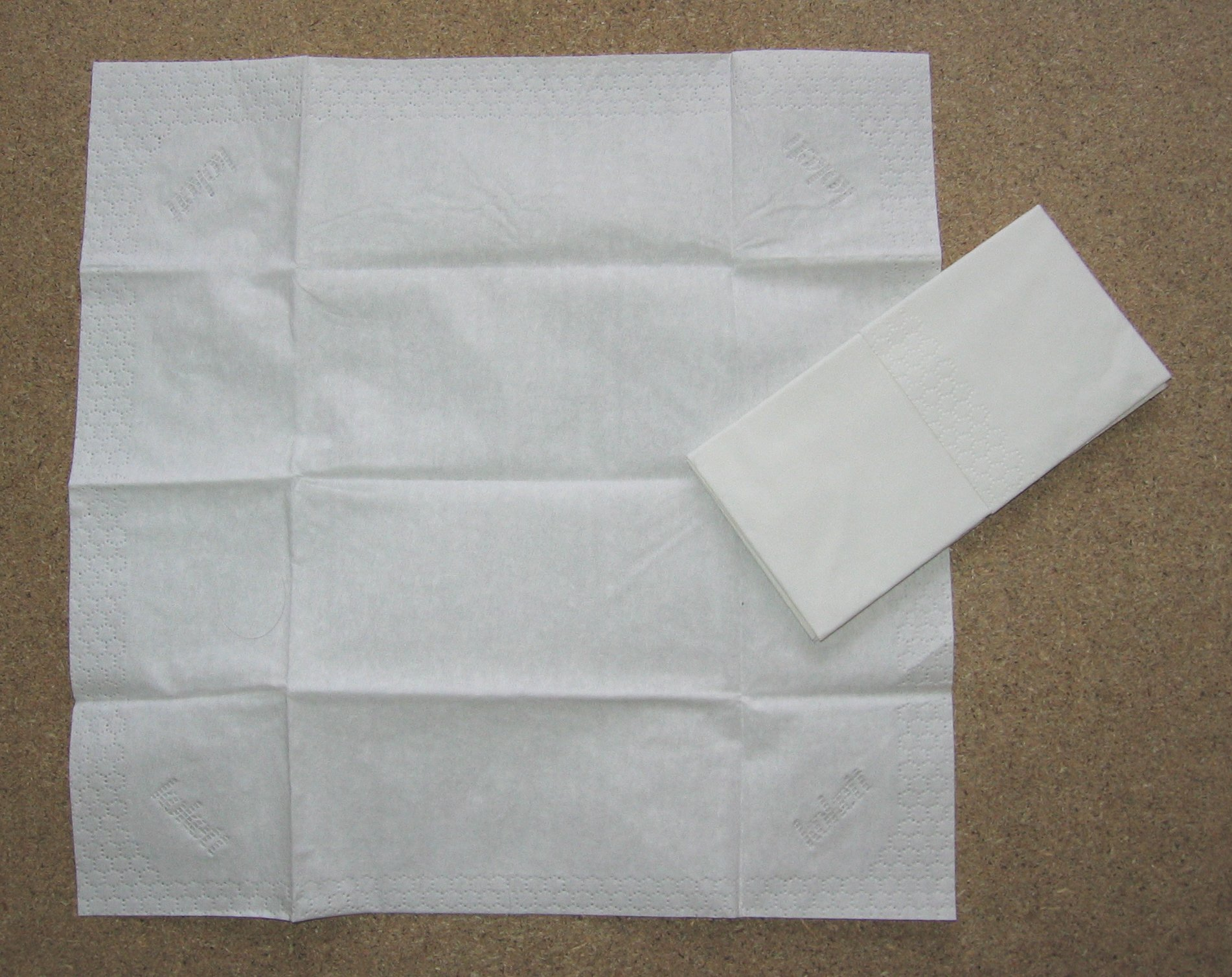
Tissue paper sheet

Tissue paper, or simply tissue, is a thin gauzy paper or light crêpe paper. Tissue can be made from recycled paper pulp on a paper machine.

Tissue paper is very versatile, and different kinds are made to best serve these purposes, which are hygienic tissue paper, facial tissues, paper towels, as packing material, among other (sometimes creative) uses.

The use of tissue paper is common in developed nations, around 21 million tonnes in North America and 6 million in Europe, and is growing due to urbanization. As a result, the industry has often been scrutinized for deforestation. However, more companies are presently using more recycled fibres in tissue paper.

== Production ==
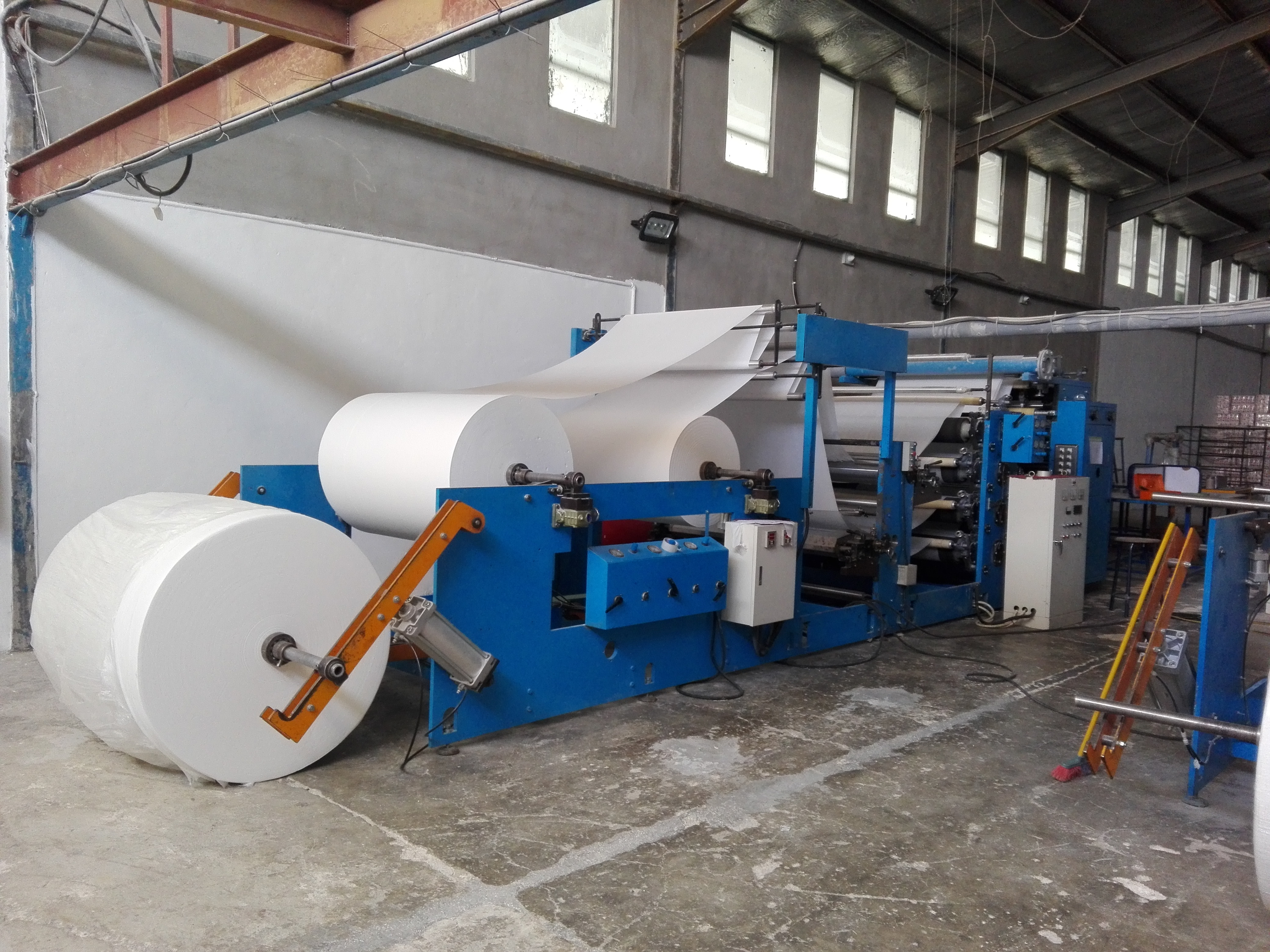
Tissue paper converting machines with jumbo rolls attached

Tissue paper, particularly low-density tissue paper, is produced on a paper machine that has a single large steam heated drying cylinder (Yankee dryer) fitted with a hot air hood. The raw material is paper pulp. The Yankee cylinder is sprayed with adhesives to make the paper stick. Creping is done by the Yankee's doctor blade that is scraping the dry paper off the cylinder surface. The crinkle (crêping) is controlled by the strength of the adhesive, geometry of the doctor blade, speed difference between the Yankee and final section of the paper machine and paper pulp characteristics.

The highest water absorbing applications are produced with a through air drying (TAD) process. These papers contain high amounts of NBSK and CTMP. This gives a bulky paper with high wet tensile strength and good water holding capacity. The TAD process uses about twice the energy compared with conventional drying of paper.

The properties are controlled by pulp quality, crêping and additives (both in base paper and as coating). The wet strength is often an important parameter for tissue.

== Applications ==
=== Hygienic tissue paper ===
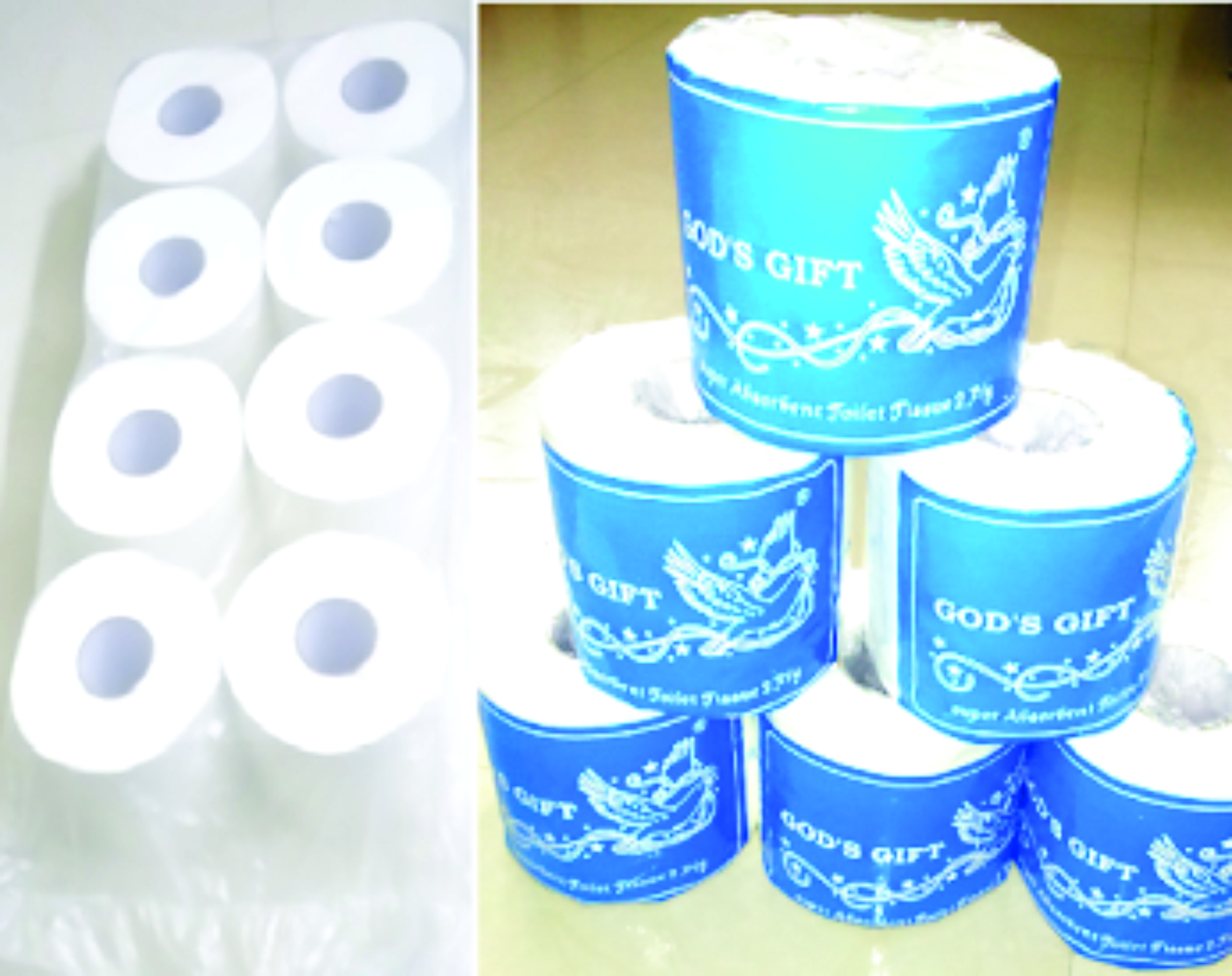
Tissue paper rolls used in toilets

Hygienic tissue paper is a class of soft, disposable tissue paper commonly used as facial tissue (paper handkerchiefs), napkins, bathroom tissue and household towels. The first product innovations which led to the new uses of paper began in the first half of the 20th century. In 1915, Klimberly-Clark invented cellucotton—an absorbent material—creating the new market for hygienic tissue paper. In 1919, feminine hygiene products and cleansing products were commercialised.

=== Facial tissues ===
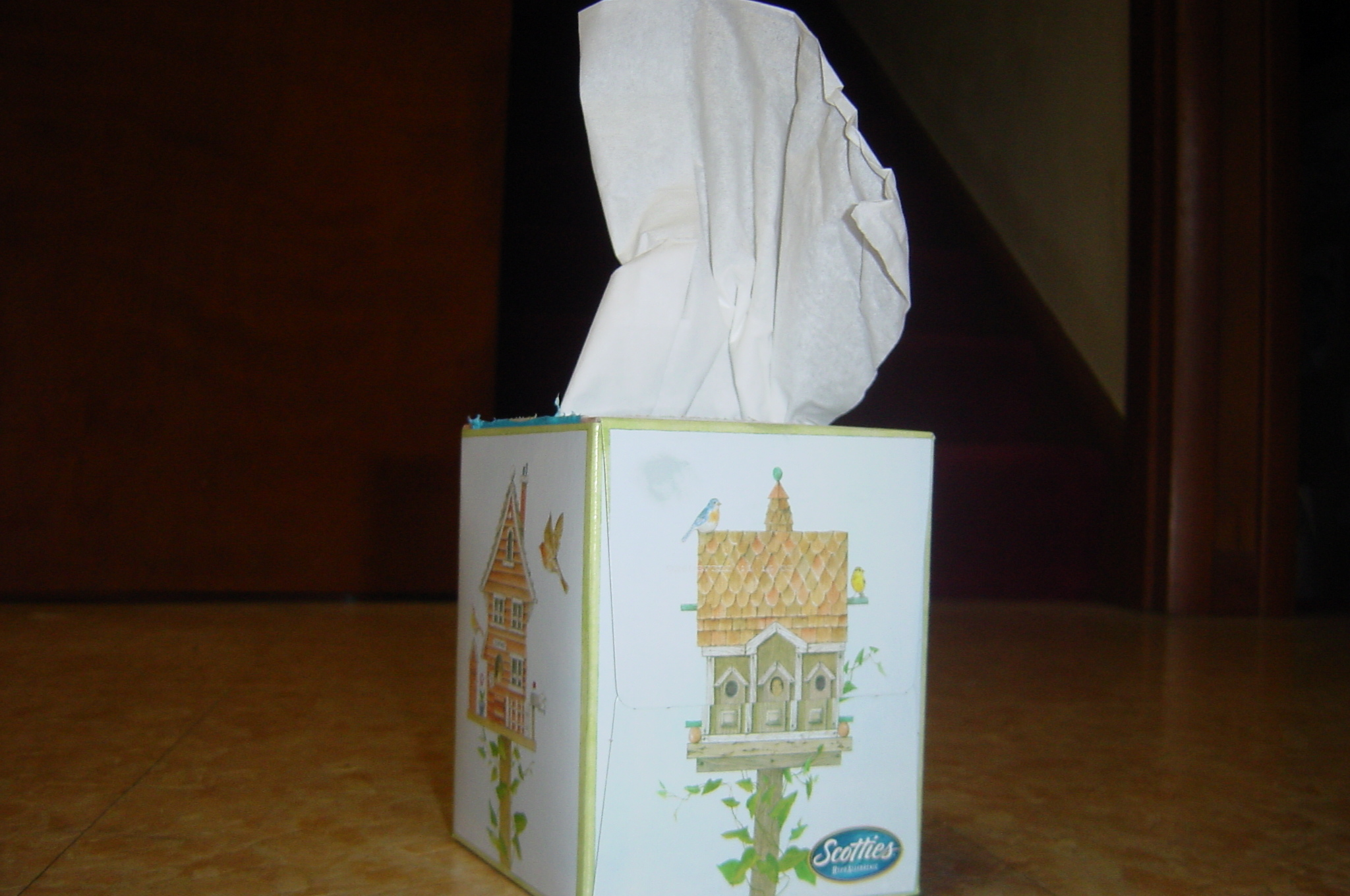
A box of facial tissues

Facial tissue (paper handkerchiefs) refers to a class of soft, absorbent, disposable paper that is suitable for use on the face. The term is commonly used to refer to the type of facial tissue, usually sold in boxes, that is designed to facilitate the expulsion of nasal mucus although it may refer to other types of facial tissues including napkins and wipes.

The first tissue handkerchiefs were introduced in the 1920s. They have been refined over the years, especially for softness and strength, but their basic design has remained constant. Today each person in Western Europe uses about 200 tissue handkerchiefs a year, with a variety of 'alternative' functions including the treatment of minor wounds, the cleaning of face and hands and the cleaning of spectacles.

The importance of the paper tissue on minimising the spread of an infection has been highlighted in light of fears over a swine flu epidemic. In the UK, for example, the Government ran a campaign called "Catch it, Bin it, Kill it", which encouraged people to cover their mouth with a paper tissue when coughing or sneezing.

Pressure on use of tissue papers has grown in the wake of improved hygiene concerns in response to the coronavirus pandemic.

=== Paper towels ===
Paper towels are the second largest application for tissue paper in the consumer sector. This type of paper has usually a basis weight of 20 to 24 g/m^{2}. Normally such paper towels are two-ply. This kind of tissue can be made from 100% chemical pulp to 100% recycled fibre or a combination of the two. Normally, some long fibre chemical pulp is included to improve strength.

=== Wrapping tissue ===
Wrapping tissue is a type of thin, translucent tissue paper used for wrapping/packing various articles and cushioning fragile items.

Custom-printed wrapping tissue is becoming a popular trend for boutique retail businesses. There are various on-demand custom printed wrapping tissue paper available online. Sustainably printed custom tissue wrapping paper are printed on FSC-certified, acid-free paper; and only use soy-based inks.

Custom-printed wrapping tissue is increasingly used by boutique retailers for brand presentation and premium packaging.

=== Toilet paper ===
Rolls of toilet paper have been available since the end of the 19th century. Today, more than 20 billion rolls of toilet tissue are used each year in Western Europe. Toilet paper brands include, Andrex (United Kingdom), Charmin (United States) and Quilton (Australia), among many others.

=== Table napkins ===
Table napkins can be made of tissue paper. These are made from one up to four plies and in a variety of qualities, sizes, folds, colours and patterns depending on intended use and prevailing fashions. The composition of raw materials varies a lot from deinked to chemical pulp depending on quality.

=== Acoustic disrupter ===
In the late 1970s and early 1980s, a sound recording engineer named Bob Clearmountain was said to have hung tissue paper over the tweeter of his pair of Yamaha NS-10 speakers to tame the over-bright treble coming from it.

The phenomenon became the subject of hot debate and an investigation into the sonic effects of many different types of tissue paper. The authors of a study for Studio Sound magazine suggested that had the speakers' grilles been used in studios, they would have had the same effect on the treble output as the improvised tissue paper filter. Another tissue study found inconsistent results with different paper, but said that tissue paper generally demonstrated an undesirable effect known as "comb filtering", where the high frequencies are reflected back into the tweeter instead of being absorbed. The author derided the tissue practice as "aberrant behavior", saying that engineers usually fear comb filtering and its associated cancellation effects, suggesting that more controllable and less random electronic filtering would be preferable.

=== Road repair ===
Tissue paper, in the form of standard single-ply toilet paper, is commonly used in road repair to protect crack sealants. The sealants require upwards of 40 minutes to cure enough to not stick onto passing traffic. The application of toilet paper removes the stickiness and keeps the tar in place, allowing the road to be reopened immediately and increasing road repair crew productivity. The paper breaks down and disappears in the following days. The use has been credited to Minnesota Department of Transportation employee Fred Muellerleile, who came up with the idea in 1970 after initially trying standard office paper, which worked, but did not disintegrate easily.

=== Packing industry ===
Apart from above, a range of speciality tissues are also manufactured to be used in the packing industry. These are used for wrapping/packing various items, cushioning fragile items, stuffing in shoes/bags etc. to keep shape intact or, for inserting in garments etc. while packing/folding to keep them wrinkle free and safe. It is generally used printed with the manufacturers brand name or, logo to enhance the look and aesthetic appeal of the product. It is a type of thin, translucent paper generally in the range of grammages between 17 and 40 GSM, that can be rough or, shining, hard or soft, depending upon the nature of use.

=== Origami ===
The use of double-tissue, triple-tissue, tissue-foil and Methyl cellulose coated tissue papers are gaining increasing popularity. Due to the paper's low grammage the paper can be folded into intricate models when treated with Methyl Cellulose (also referred to as MC). The inexpensive paper provides incredible paper memory paired with paper strength (when MC treated). Origami models sometimes require both thin and highly malleable papers, for this tissue-foil is considered a prime choice.

== The industry ==
Consumption of tissue in North America is three times greater than in Europe: out of the world's estimated production of 21 million tonnes (21,000,000 long tons; 23,000,000 short tons) of tissue, Europe produces approximately 6 million tonnes (5,900,000 long tons; 6,600,000 short tons).

The European tissue market is worth approximately 10 billion Euros annually and is growing at a rate of around 3%. The European market represents around 23% of the global market. Of the total paper and board market tissue accounts for 10%. An analysis and market research in Europe, Germany was one of the top tissue-consuming countries in Western Europe while Sweden was on top of the per-capita consumption of tissue paper in Western Europe. Market Study.

In Europe, the industry is represented by the European Tissue Symposium (ETS), a trade association. The members of ETS represent the majority of tissue paper producers throughout Europe and about 90% of total European tissue production. ETS was founded in 1971 and is based in Brussels since 1992.

In the U.S., the tissue industry is organized in the AF&PA.

Tissue paper production and consumption is predicted to continue to grow because of factors like urbanization, increasing disposable incomes and consumer spending. In 2015, the global market for tissue paper was growing at per annum rates between 8–9% (China, currently 40% of global market) and 2–3% (Europe). During the COVID-19 pandemic, tissue demand for homes increased dramatically as people spent more time in their homes, while commercial demand for the product decreased.

=== Companies ===
The largest tissue producing companies by capacity – some of them also global players – in 2015 are (in descending order):

1. Essity
2. Kimberly-Clark
3. Georgia-Pacific
4. Asia Pulp & Paper (APP)/Sinar Mas
5. Procter & Gamble
6. Sofidel Group
7. CMPC
8. WEPA Hygieneprodukte
9. Metsä Group
10. Cascades

== See also ==
- Air-laid paper
- Crêpe paper
- Handkerchief
- Tissue-pack marketing
- Washi
- Yankee dryer
- Sanitary paper
