= Genie (disambiguation) =

A genie, or jinn, is a supernatural creature in early pre-Islamic Arabian and later Islamic mythology and theology.

Genie may also refer to:

== Arts and entertainment ==
- Genies in popular culture

=== Fictional characters ===
- Genie (Disney), a character in Disney's Aladdin franchise
- Genie, a creature type in Advanced Dungeons & Dragons 2nd edition

=== Gaming ===
- Genie (pinball), pinball machine
- Game Genie, a series of video game cheat systems
- Genie Engine, a game engine

=== Music ===
- Genie (EP), by Girls' Generation, 2009
  - "Genie" (Girls' Generation song), 2009
- "Genie" (YoungBoy Never Broke Again song), 2018
- "Genie", a song by Marillion from the 2004 album Marbles
- "Genie", a song by Spice from the 2018 mixtape Captured
- "The Genie", a song by Snoop Doggy Dogg from the 2009 album Death Row: The Lost Sessions Vol. 1
- The Genie, a 1986 studio album by singer-songwriter Rockwell

=== Films ===
- Genie (2023 film), 2023 American Christmas film

== Businesses ==
- GEnie, a former online service by General Electric
- The Genie Company, an American garage door manufacturer
- Genie Energy, an American energy company
- Genie Music, a South Korean company that produces and distributes music content
  - Genie Music Awards
- Genie (Terex), an American manufacturer of construction lift equipment

== Military ==
- The Douglas AIR-2 Genie, an unguided air-to-air rocket with a nuclear warhead.

== People ==
- Genie (feral child) (born 1957), the pseudonym of an American feral child
- Genie Bouchard (born 1994), Canadian tennis player
- Genie Chuo (born 1986), Taiwanese actor and singer
- Genie Chance (1927–1998), American journalist, radio broadcaster, and politician
- Genie Clark Pomeroy (1867–?), American writer and poet
- Genie Francis (born 1962), American actress
- Genie Z. Laborde (born 1928), American author, educator, video producer, and artist
- Genie Montalvo (born 1951), Puerto Rican actress, director, producer, and author
- Genie M. Smith (1852–?), American author and publisher
- Genie Pace, an American jazz and pop singer of the 1950s/60s
- Genie Sheppard (1863–1953), a British militant suffragette
- Genie, a professional wrestler from NWA All-Star Wrestling

== Science and technology ==
- Genie Backup Manager, backup software for Windows
- Genie Workbench, a suite of film and TV production software
- Genie, a DirecTV digital video recorder
- ALGOL 68 Genie, a programming language
  - Genie, a Python-inspired variant of the Vala programming language
- AIR-2 Genie, an American air-to-air nuclear rocket
- Diaper Genie, a diaper disposal system
- Project Genie, a 1964 computer project at UC Berkeley
- Tmall Genie, a smart speaker
- Video Genie, an early 1980s computer
  - Colour Genie, from 1982
- Genie (text-to-video model), a generative artificial intelligence model

== Other uses ==
- Genie Awards, Canadian film awards 1980–2012
- Genie, a name for synthetic cannabinoids

== See also ==
- Djinn (disambiguation), including Djin
- Geni (disambiguation)
- Genius (mythology) (pl.: genii), the divine element of a person, place or thing in ancient Roman religion
  - Minoan Genius, a legendary creature in Minoan mythology
- Jeannie (disambiguation)
  - Jeannie, a genie character in the American fantasy sitcom I Dream of Jeannie
- Genie in the House, a British TV sitcom
- Jinn (disambiguation)
- Les Djinns (disambiguation)
- Winged genie, a motif in Iron Age art of Assyria
- "The Jean Genie", a song by David Bowie
