= Ramon Lazkano =

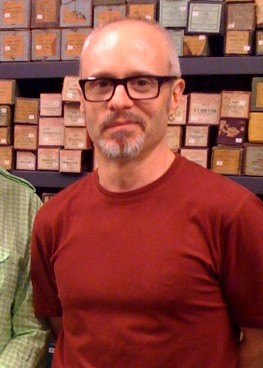
Ramon Lazkano

Ramon Lazkano (born 26 June 1968) is a contemporary French and Spanish Basque composer of classical music.

== Career ==
Born in San Sebastián, Basque Country, Spain, in 1968, Lazkano attended piano and composition classes at the San Sebastián Higher Conservatory of Music, where he obtained a Higher Degree in Composition. Holding a Gipuzkoako Foru Diputazioa scholarship, he was accepted at the Conservatoire National Supérieur de Musique of Paris, where he studied composition and orchestration with Alain Bancquart and Gérard Grisey, and was awarded a First Prize of Composition in 1990. A Sasakawa Foundation Scholarship allowed him to follow the studies of composition and analysis in Montreal with Gilles Tremblay. At his return to Paris, he studied orchestra conducting with Jean-Sébastien Béreau and Arturo Tamayo, and received a DEA degree in 20th Century Music and Musicology from the'Ecole des Hautes Etudes en Sciences Sociales.

His piano concerto Hitzaurre Bi earned him, at the age of 26, the prestigious Prince Pierre de Monaco Foundation Prize. Shortly afterwards, in 1997, a jury chaired by Luciano Berio gave him the Leonard Bernstein-Jerusalem Composition Prize for his Auhen Kantuak. In 2007, the French Academy of Fine Arts gives him the Georges Bizet Award; he was also a prizewinner of the Institute of Music and Drama Arts, the Colegio de España, and the Gaudeamus Foundation. While resident with the Joven Orquesta Nacional de España, he had the opportunity of composing several pieces which were performed, among others, at the Auditorio Nacional in Madrid and Berlin Konzerthaus. Stanford University invited him in 1999 to introduce his music and that same year he was appointed, along with Luis de Pablo, resident at the Musica Festival and the Strasburg Conservatoire. His residence in Rome (first as a scholar of the, then of the Villa Medici French Academy in Rome) allowed him to carry out a reflection on what composition is and what it means today, focusing mainly on thoughts about intertextuality and the saturation, silence and experience of sound and time, all of which giving birth to emblematic pieces such as Ilunkor (commissioned by the Euskadiko Orkestra Sinfonikoa) and Lur-Itzalak (commissioned by the Printemps des Arts of Monte Carlo).

His works have been played in many countries (France, Germany, the Netherlands, Israel, Spain, Italy, Ukraine, Denmark, United Kingdom, Russia, USA, Austria, and others) in the framework of prestigious festivals such as: Musica (Strasbourg), Ars Musica (Brussels), Festival d’Automne (Paris), Éclat (Stuttgart), Witten (Germany), Présences in Radio-France, Philharmonic Green Umbrella New Music series (Los Angeles), Gaudeamus Muziekweek (Amsterdam), International Society of Contemporary Music (Copenhagen), Festival of Contemporary Music (Alicante, Spain). His music has been played by such renowned orchestras and ensembles as, among others, the Philharmonic Orchestra of Radio France, the Symphony Orchestra of Jerusalem, the National Orchestra of Spain, the Symphony Orchestra of Euskadi, the Symphony Orchestra of Bilbao, the Spanish Broadcast Symphony Orchestra, the Orchestra of the Teatre Lliure of Barcelona, the ensembles Gaudeamus, Ictus and Accroche Note, the Ensemble Barcelona 216, the Conjunto Ibérico de Violoncellos, Ensemble Wiener Collage. He has been commissioned by the Ministry of Culture (France), the Basque Government, the CDMC (Spain), Radio France, ABRSM of London, the Orquestra de Cadaqués, the Orquesta de la Comunidad de Madrid, and others.

Lazkano gave orchestration lessons at the Strasburg Conservatoire and composition lessons at the Higher Academy of Music of Catalonia in Barcelona. At present, he is professor of orchestration at the Higher Academy of Music of the Basque Country "Musikene".

== Works ==
=== Opera ===
- La Main gauche (2025) for soprano, tenor, baritone & chamber orchestra, libretto by the composer after Jean Echenoz's novel Ravel.

=== Orchestra ===
- Hondar (2017) for large orchestra
- Hauskor (2006) for eight cellos & orchestra
- Ttakun (2005–06)
- Ortzi Isilak (2005) for clarinet & orchestra
- Itaun (2003) for accordion & orchestra
- Hilarriak (2002–2003)
- Ilunkor (2000–01)
- Zur-Haitz (1999)
- Ilgora (1998) for string orchestra
- Eriden (1997–98) for chamber orchestra
- Hitzaurre Bi (1993) for piano & orchestra
- Oskorriz (1990)

=== Chamber music ===
Igeltsoen Laborategia (Laboratory of Chalks):

- Egan-1 (2006) for ensemble
- Egan-2 (2006–07) for ensemble
- Egan-3 (2007) for ensemble
- Wintersonnenwende (2005) for string trio & celesta
- Wintersonnenwende-2 (2007) for cello and piano: I, II
- Hatsik-1 (2001) for E♭ clarinet, trombone, cello & piano
- Hatsik-2 (2002) for alt saxophone, double bass, accordion and percussion
- Hatsik-3 (2004) for violin, clarinet, alt saxophone and piano
- Laiotz (2003) five pieces for two pianos and two percussions

Itzalen Zikloa (Cycle of Shadows):

- Lur-Itzalak (2003) for violin and cello
- Haize-Itzalak (2002) for string sextet
- Su-Itzalak (1991) for eight cellos

Other Chamber Music:

- Nahasmahasi (2002) for flute, alt saxophone, guitar, piano and percussion
- Aurresku (2000) for saxophone quartet, piano & 2 percussions
- Hizkirimiri (1999) for bass clarinet, guitar, marimba & doublebass
- Seaska Kanta (Berceuse) (1998) for flute and string quintet (or string orchestra)
- Ur Loak (1998) for bass flute, contrabass clarinet, two string quintets and two percussions
- Hodeiertz (1997) pour alt saxophone & percussion
- Sorginkeriak (1995) for small ensemble
- Hizpide (1995) for viola, alto flute & guitar
- Hitzaro (1994) for alto flute & guitar
- Izotz (1993) for string quartet
- Eskaintza (1992) for ensemble
- Bihurketak (1991) for violin, cello and piano
- Quinteto (1991) for wind quintet
- Chant III (1990) for bass clarinet, 3 trombones & 3 cellos
- Chant II (1989) for viola & tape or viola solo & four violas
- Argilunak (1989) for baryton saxophone & two cellos

=== Music for solo instruments ===
- Zintzilik (2005) for piano 4 hands
- Presencia (in memoriam Joaquin Homs) (2005) for piano
- Ezkil (2002) for guitar (with quarter-tone scordatura)
- Gentle Sway (2002) for piano
- 4. Bakarrizketa (2000) for piano
- Zortziko (2000) for piano
- Sorgindantza (2000) for organ
- Aztarnak (2000) for accordion
- Suziri (1999) for piano
- Seaska Kanta (Berceuse) (1998) for piano
- Ilargi Uneak (1996) for piano: 1. izar, 2. ekhi, (l. h.), 3. urtzi
- Otoitz (1996) for clarinet
- Sonatine (1996) for quarter-tone tuned guitar
- 3. Bakarrizketa (1996) for flute
- 2. Bakarrizketa (1993) for guitar
- Ekhiez (1988) for piano (left hand)

=== Vocal music ===
- Malkoak euri balira (2005) for 12 voices & guitar. Poem by Xabier Lete.
- Infantia Mea (2004) for eight mixed voices. Lyrics by Saint Augustin.
- Otoitz baten gisan (2003) for baryton & orgue. Basque poem by Xabier Lete
- Cinco poemas de Luis Cernuda (2000–02) for voice and cello octet: 1. El Prisionero, 2. El Viento y el Alma, 3. Instrumento Músico, 4. El Sino, 5. El Intruso
- Canciones de Ausencia (1999) for voice, guitar & cello. Poems by Miguel Hernández
- The Epilogue (1999) for male choir & ensemble. Lyrics from The Tempest by Shakespeare
- Auhen Kantuak (1993–95, 1997) for choirs & orchestra. Lyrics based upon Jeremiah's Lamentations and translated into Basque by Itxaro Borda.
- Les Djinns (1993) for children choir & wind orchestra, after the eponymous poem by Victor Hugo.
- Hiru seaska kanta eta etsipen abesti bat (1991) for voice & string quartet
- Madrigal (1991) for five voices. Lyrics by Catule, Cernuda & Gil de Biedma.
- Leherketa batetako hotsak (1988) for baryton, narrator & ensemble. Poem by Patxi Ezkiaga.

=== Orchestrations ===
- J. C. Arriaga – Ouverture "Los esclavos felices" for the ensemble of Mozart's Gran Partita
- M. Mussorgsky – Songs & Dances of Death for voice and orchestra
- F. G. Lorca – Canciones Antiguas Españolasfor voice and ensemble

== Writings ==
- La guitare dans notre imaginaire in "Guitares croisées – utopie ou réalité?", CNR de Strasbourg, 2004.
- "Two Feelings" with Helmut Lachenmann in "Contemporary Music Review", vol. 23, September 2004.
- El sonido como elemento natural de la deducción compositiva in "Ontology Studies – Cuadernos de Ontología", vol. 1–2, 2001.
- Préliminaires pour une étude de la polyrythmie in "Musiker", vol. 11, 1999.
