= Jinn (disambiguation) =

Jinn, or genies, are supernatural beings in Arab folklore and Islamic teachings.

Jinn may also refer to:

- Jin dynasty (1115–1234), sometimes written as Jinn to distinguish from the earlier Jin Dynasty (266–420)
- Al-Jinn or The Jinn, the 72nd chapter of the Quran

== Entertainment ==
- Jinn (band), a Japanese band
- Jinn (TV series), a 2019 Netflix TV series
- Jinn (2014 film), a film from Exxodus Pictures
- Jinn (2018 film), a 2018 film by Nijla Mu'min
- Jinn (2023 film), a 2023 film by Nader Chowdhury
- Jinn: A Novel, a 2004 book by Matthew B. J. Delaney
- Qui-Gon Jinn, a character in the Star Wars universe
- Jinn, a character in Pierre Boulle's 1963 science fiction novel La Planète des singes
- "Jinn", a song by Monuments from the 2014 album The Amanuensis
- "Jinn", a song by Northlane from the 2019 album Alien
- "The Jinn", a chapter of the 2025 Indian film Dhurandhar
  - Chaudhary Aslam a.k.a. "The Jinn", a character in the film portrayed by Sanjay Dutt

== See also ==
- Djinn (disambiguation)
- Genie (disambiguation)
- Jin (disambiguation)
- Jinnī (disambiguation)
- Jann (disambiguation)
- Jind (disambiguation)
