= Diaper =

Undergarment for body waste containment

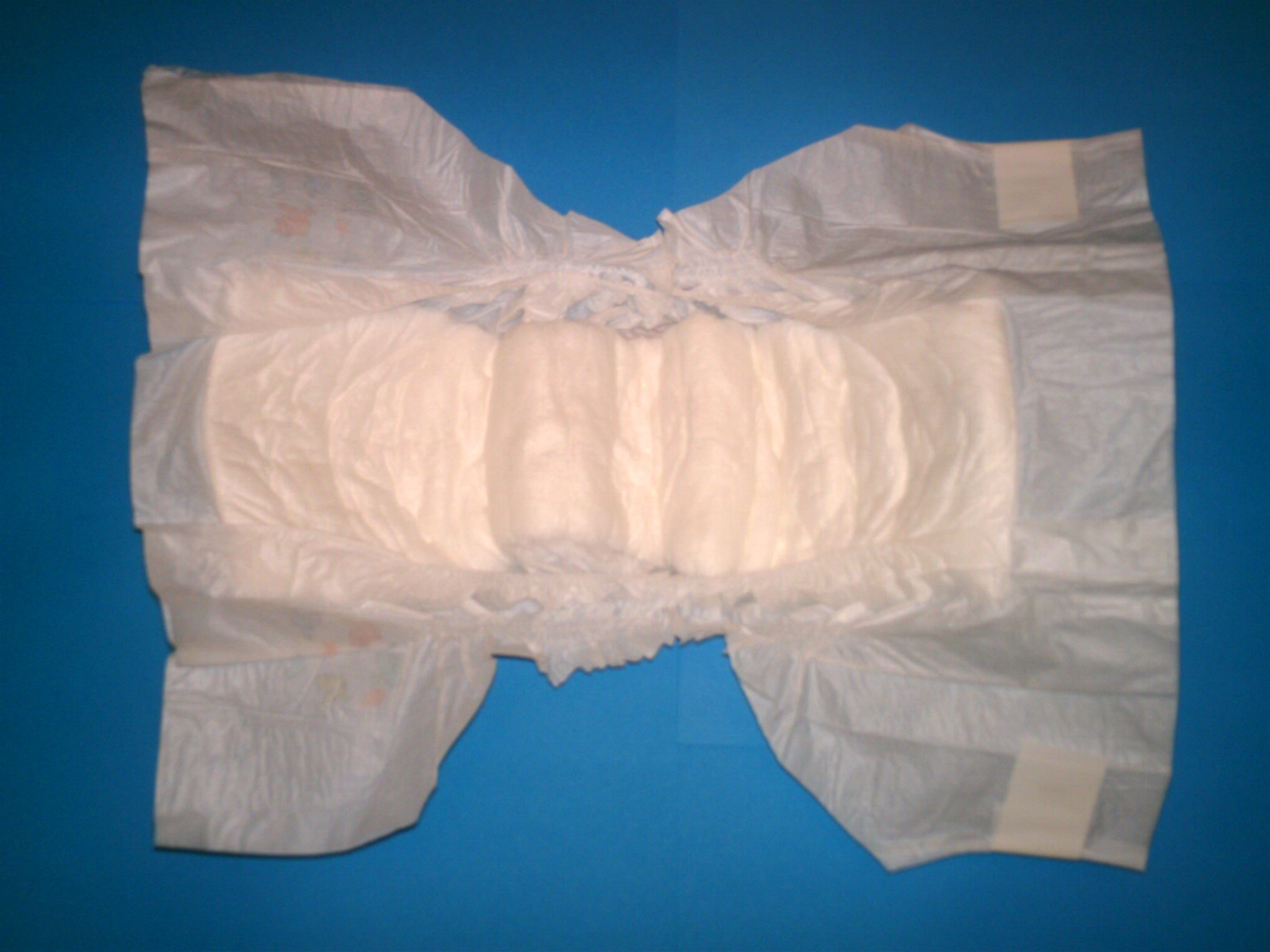
- Inside of a disposable baby diaper with resealable tapes and elasticated leg cuffs.
- Type: protective clothing

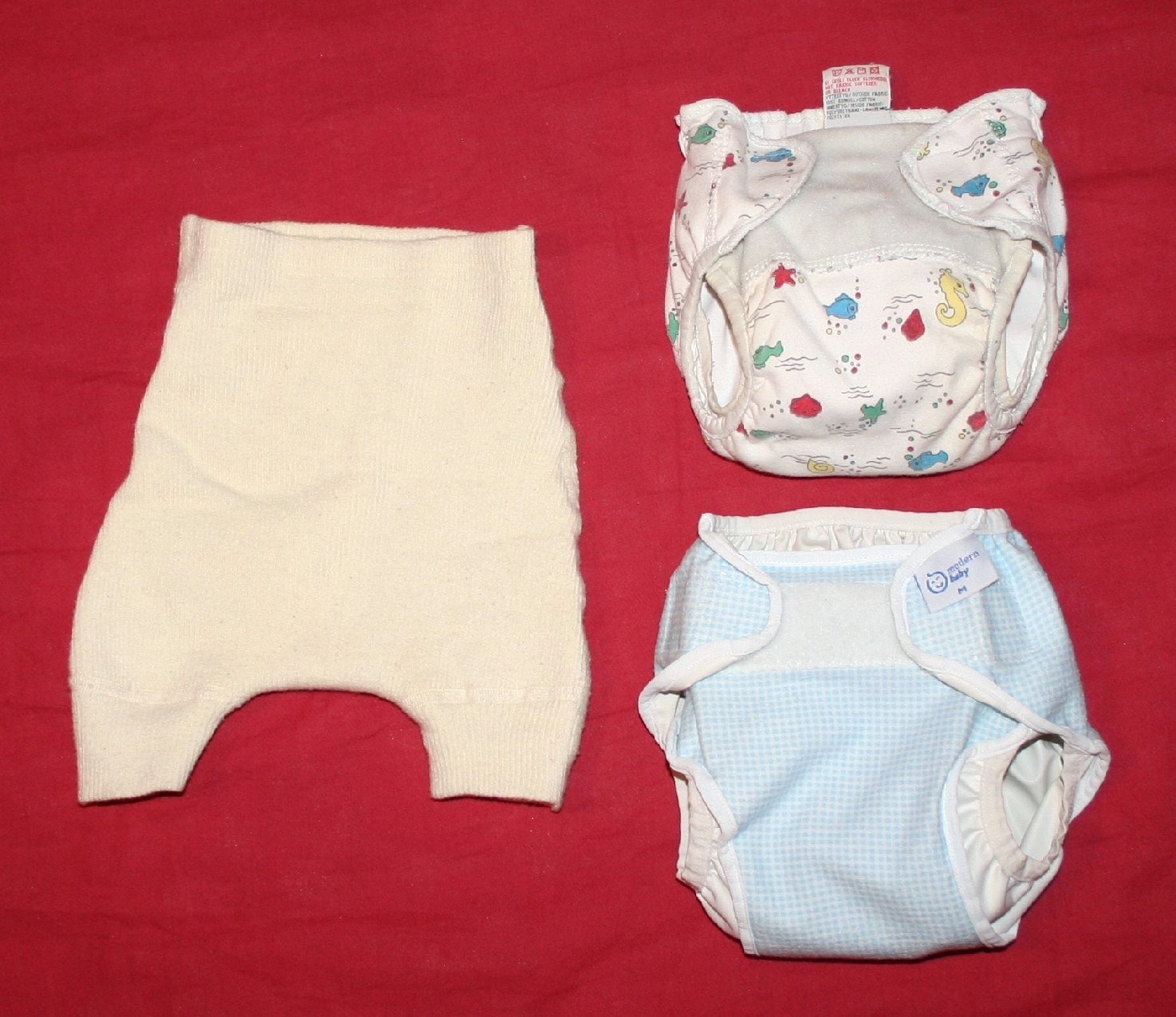
Different kinds of outer diapers.

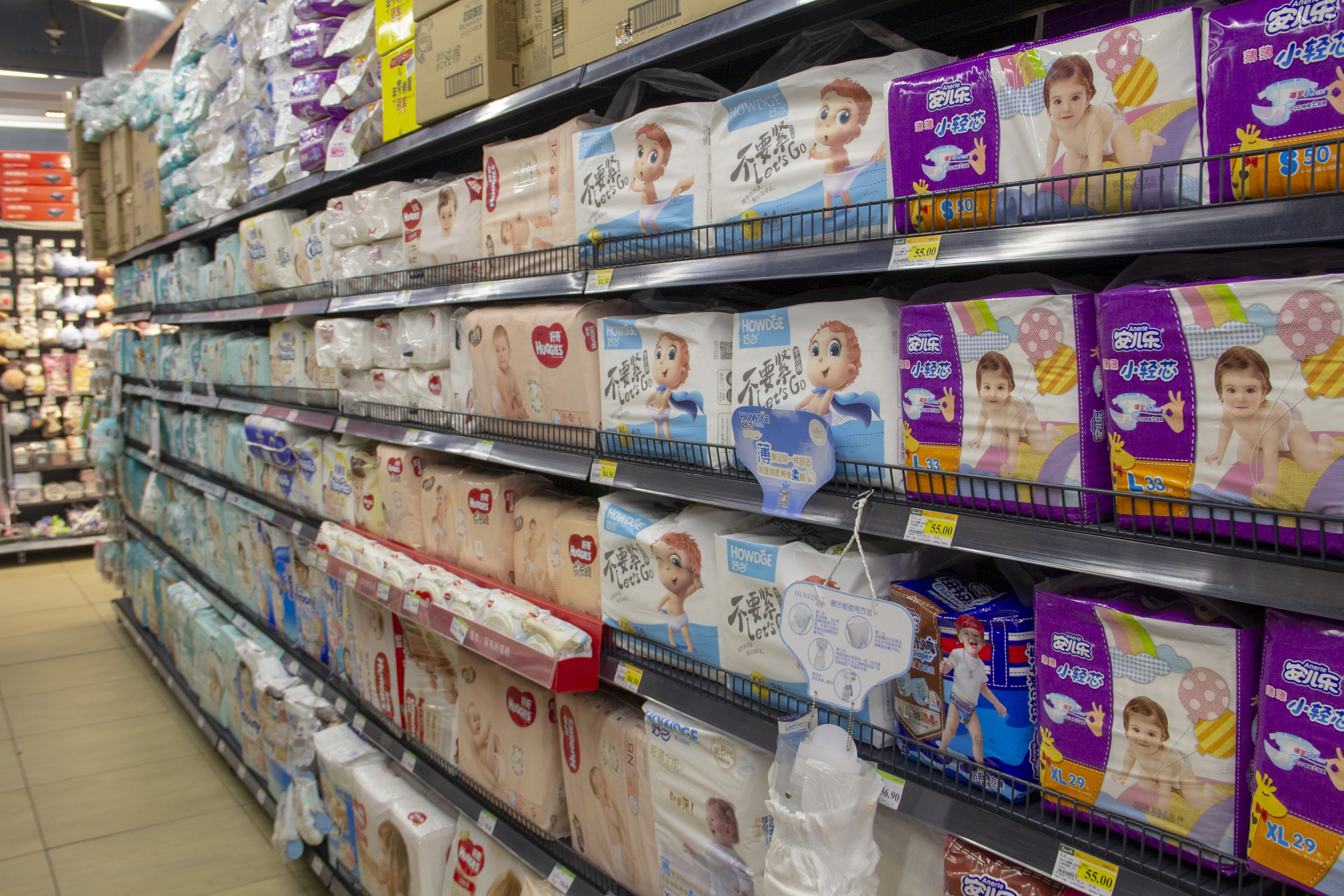
Diapers on a shelf.

A diaper (/ˈdaɪpər/, North American English) or a nappy (Australian English, British English, Hiberno-English, New Zealand English) is a type of underwear that allows the wearer to urinate or defecate without using a toilet, by absorbing or containing waste products to prevent soiling of outer clothing or the external environment. When diapers become wet or soiled, they need to be changed by the wearer or often by a second person, such as a parent or caregiver. Failure to change a diaper regularly can result in skin problems around the area covered by the diaper.

Diapers are made of cloth or synthetic disposable materials. Cloth diapers are composed of layers of fabric such as cotton, hemp, bamboo, microfiber, or even plastic fibers such as PLA or PU, and can be washed and reused multiple times. Disposable diapers contain absorbent chemicals and are thrown away after use.

Diapers are primarily worn by babies, toddlers who are not yet toilet trained, and by children who experience bedwetting. They are also used by adults under certain circumstances or with various conditions, such as incontinence. Adult users can include those of advanced age, patients bed-bound in a hospital, individuals with certain types of physical or mental disability, and people working in extreme conditions, such as astronauts. It is not uncommon for people to wear diapers under dry suits.

== History ==
=== Etymology ===
"Another bear the ewer, the third a diaper"

— One of the earliest known uses of the word in Shakespeare's The Taming of the Shrew.

The Middle English word diaper originally referred to a type of cloth rather than the use thereof; "diaper" was the term for a pattern of repeated, rhombic shapes, and later came to describe white cotton or linen fabric with this pattern. According to the Oxford Dictionary, it is a piece of soft cloth or other thick material folded around a baby's bottom and between its legs to absorb and hold its bodily waste. The first cloth diapers consisted of a specific type of soft tissue sheet, cut into geometric shapes. The pattern visible in linen and other woven fabrics was called "diaper". This meaning of the word has been in use in England since the 1590s. By the 19th century, baby diapers were being sewn from linen, giving us the modern-day reading of the word "diaper". This usage stuck in the United States and Canada following the British colonization of North America, but in the United Kingdom, the word "nappy" took its place. Most sources believe nappy is a diminutive form of the word napkin, which itself was originally a diminutive.

=== Development ===
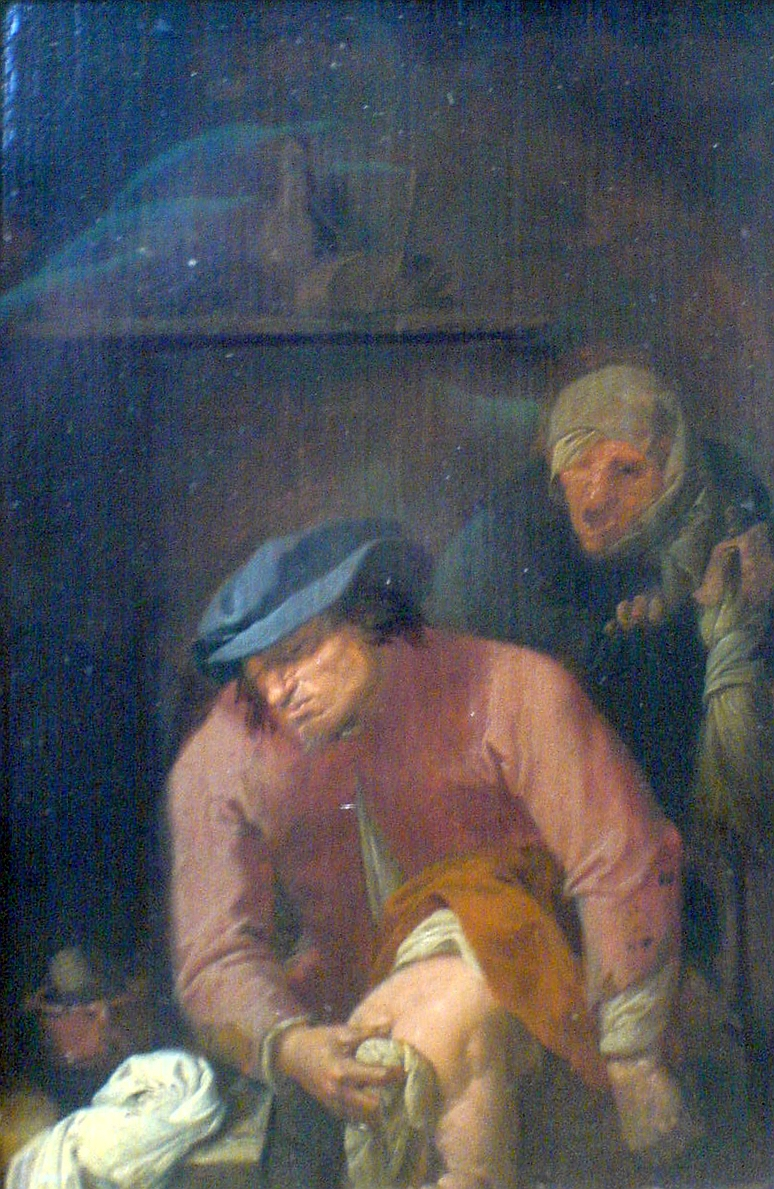
Unpleasant duties (1631) by Adriaen Brouwer, depicting the changing of a diaper

In the 19th century, the modern diaper began to take shape, and mothers in many parts of the world used cotton material, held in place with a fastening—eventually the safety pin. Cloth diapers in the United States were first mass-produced in 1887 by Maria Allen. In the UK, diapers were made out of terry towelling, often with an inner lining of soft muslin.

Here is an extract from 'The Modern Home Doctor' written by physicians in the UK in 1935.

Nice old, soft bits of good Turkish towelling, properly washed, will make the softest of diaper coverings, inside which specially absorbent napkins (diapers), see below at 1A, soft, light, and easily washed, are contained. These should rarely be soiled once regular habits have been inculcated, especially during the night period in which it is most important to prevent habit formation
1A -(squares of butter muslin or Harrington's packed rolls of "mutton cloth" in packets, sold for polishing motor-cars, would do equally well and are very cheap and soft)

Wool pants, or, once available, rubber pants, were sometimes used over the cloth diaper to prevent leakage. Doctors believed that rubber pants were harmful because they thought the rubber acted as a poultice and damaged infants' skin. The constant problem to be overcome was diaper rash, and the infection thereof. The concern was that the lack of air circulation would worsen this condition. While lack of air circulation is a factor, it was later found that poor hygiene, involving ineffectively washed diapers and infrequent diaper changes, along with allowing the baby to lie for prolonged periods with fecal matter in contact with the skin, were the two main causes of these problems.

In the 20th century, the disposable diaper was conceived. In the 1930s, Robinsons of Chesterfield listed what were labeled "Destroyable Babies Napkins" in their catalogue for the wholesale market. In 1944, Hugo Drangel of the Swedish paper company Pauliström suggested a conceptual design which would entail the placing of sheets of paper tissue (cellulose wadding) inside the cloth diaper and rubber pants. However, cellulose wadding was rough against the skin and crumbled into balls when exposed to moisture.

In 1946, Marion Donovan used a shower curtain from her bathroom to create the "Boater", a diaper cover made from army surplus nylon parachute cloth. First sold in 1949 at Saks Fifth Avenue's flagship store in New York City, the waterproof diaper was later patented in 1951 by Donovan, who sold the rights to it for $1 million. Donovan also designed a paper disposable diaper, but was unsuccessful in marketing it. In 1947, Scottish housewife Valerie Hunter Gordon started developing and making Paddi, a 2-part system consisting of a disposable pad (made of cellulose wadding covered with cotton wool) worn inside an adjustable plastic garment with press-studs/snaps. Initially, she used old parachutes for the garment. She applied for the patent in April 1948, and it was granted for the UK in October 1949. Initially, the big manufacturers were unable to see the commercial possibilities of disposable diapers. In 1948, Gordon made over 400 Paddis herself using her sewing machine at the kitchen table. Her husband had unsuccessfully approached several companies for help until he had a chance meeting with Sir Robert Robinson at a business dinner. In November 1949, Valerie Gordon signed a contract with Robinsons of Chesterfield, who then went into full production. In 1950, Boots UK agreed to sell Paddi in all its branches. In 1951, the Paddi patent was granted in the United States and worldwide. Shortly after that, Playtex and several other large international companies tried unsuccessfully to buy out Paddi from Robinsons. Paddi was very successful for many years until the advent of 'all-in-one' diapers.

In Sweden, Hugo Drangel's daughter Lil Karhola Wettergren, in 1956, elaborated her father's original idea by adding a garment (again making a 2-part system like Paddi). However, she encountered the same problem with the purchasing managers, who declared they would never allow their wives to "put paper on their children."

After the Second World War, mothers increasingly wanted freedom from washing diapers so they could work and travel, leading to a growing demand for disposable diapers.

During the 1950s, companies such as Johnson and Johnson, Kendall, Parke-Davis, Playtex, and Molnlycke entered the disposable diaper market, and in 1956, Procter & Gamble began researching disposable diapers. Victor Mills, along with his project group, including William Dehaas (both men who worked for the company), invented what would be trademarked as "Pampers". Although Pampers were conceptualized in 1959, the diapers themselves were not launched until 1961. Pampers now accounts for more than $10 billion in annual revenue at Procter & Gamble.

As Audrey Quinn recounts about the 1980s "Diaper Wars",

Procter & Gamble took Kimberly-Clark to court for patent infringement — one diaper patent at a time. And Kimberly-Clark responded in pretty much the same way.

—

'The Engineering of a Disposable Diaper' - video by Bill Hammack

Over the next few decades, the disposable diaper industry boomed, and the competition between Procter & Gamble's Pampers and Kimberly-Clark's Huggies led to lower prices and significant changes in diaper design. Several improvements were made, including the use of double gussets to enhance diaper fit and containment. As stated in Procter & Gamble's initial 1973 patent for the use of double gussets in a diaper, "The double gusset folded areas tend to readily conform to the thigh portions of the leg of the infant. This allows quick and easy fitting and provides a snug and comfortable diaper fit that will neither bind nor wad on the infant...as a result of this snugger fit obtained because of this fold configuration, the diaper is less likely to leak or, in other words, its containment characteristics are greatly enhanced." Further developments in diaper design were made, such as the introduction of refastenable tapes, the "hourglass shape" so as to reduce bulk at the crotch area, and the 1984 introduction of superabsorbent material from polymers known as sodium polyacrylate that were originally developed in 1966.

== Types ==
=== Disposable ===
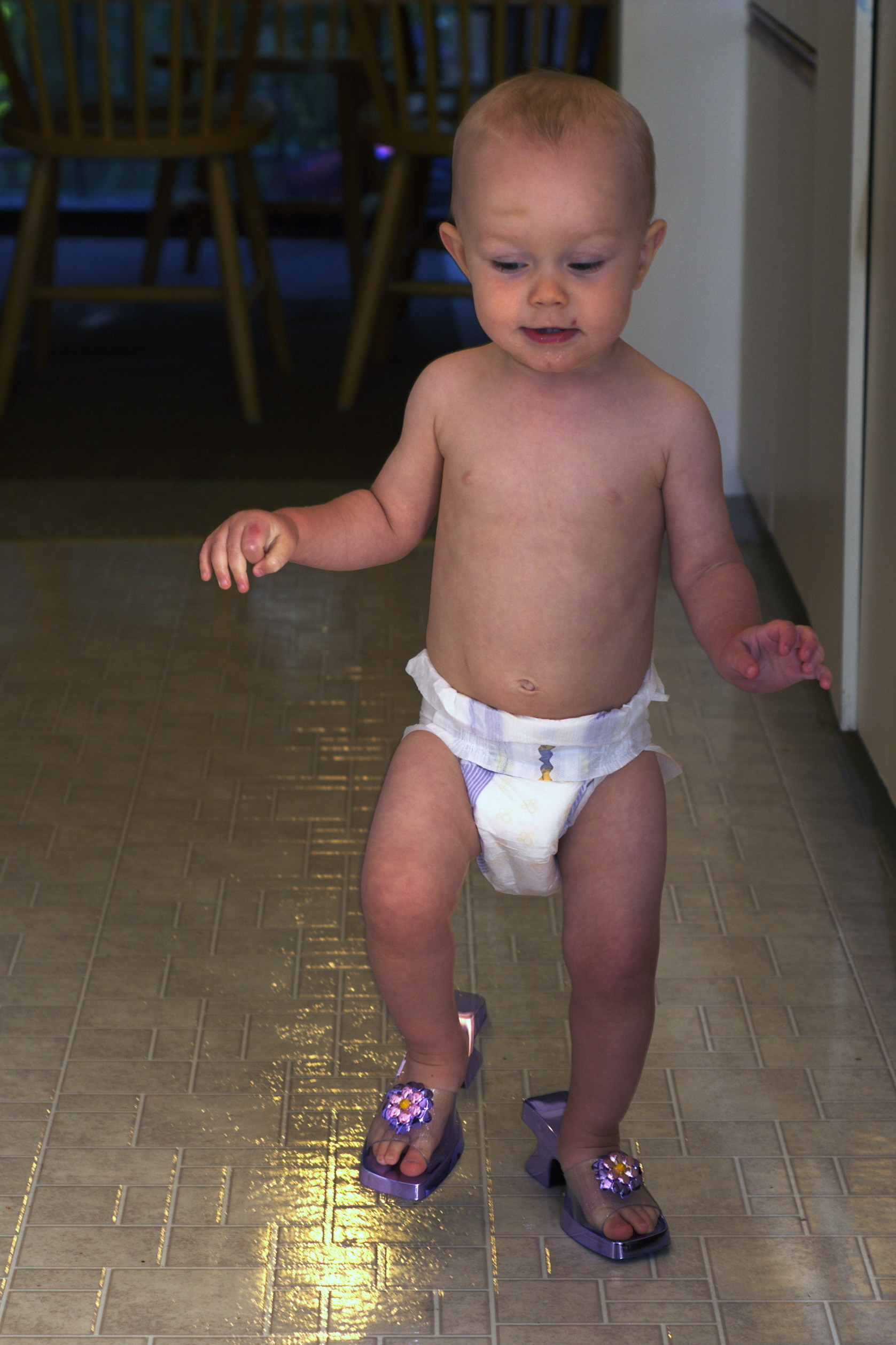
A baby wearing a disposable diaper

The first waterproof diaper cover was invented in 1946 by Marion Donovan, a professional-turned-housewife who wanted to ensure her children's clothing and bedding remained dry while they slept. She also invented the first paper diapers. Still, executives did not invest in this idea, and it was consequently scrapped for over ten years until Procter & Gamble used Donovan's design ideas to create Pampers. Another disposable diaper design was created by Valerie Hunter Gordon and patented in 1948.

Ever since their introduction, product innovations have included the use of superabsorbent polymers, resealable tapes, and elasticised waistbands. They are now much thinner and much more absorbent. The product range has recently been extended to the children's toilet-training phase with the introduction of training pants and pant diapers.

Modern disposable baby diapers and incontinence products have a layered construction that allows urine to transfer to and be distributed within an absorbent core, where it is locked in. Basic layers are an outer shell of breathable polyethylene film or a nonwoven and film composite which prevents wetness and soil transfer, an inner absorbent layer of a mixture of air-laid paper and superabsorbent polymers for wetness, and a layer nearest the skin of nonwoven material with a distribution layer directly beneath which will transfer wetness to the absorbent layer. Some popular brands of disposable baby diapers feature layers of colorful film that decorate the diapers with cute, kid-friendly designs, such as animals or characters from movies and TV shows, while other brands are plain white.

Other common features of disposable diapers include one or more pairs of either adhesive or mechanical fastening tapes to keep the diaper securely fastened. Some diapers have refastenable tapes, allowing for adjustments to fit or reapplication after inspection. Elasticized fabric single and double gussets around the leg and waist areas aid in fitting and in containing urine or stool that has not been absorbed. Baby diapers now have wetness indicators, which consist of a moisture-sensitive ink printed in the front of the diaper as either a fading design or a color-changing line to alert the carer or user that the diaper is wet. A disposable diaper may also include an inner fabric layer designed to hold moisture against the skin for a brief period before it is absorbed, alerting a toilet-training or bedwetting user that they have urinated. Some brands also have a quick-absorption layer that pulls urine and soft stool away from the baby's skin, which is helpful to parents, especially after they have put their little one to bed, so diapers don't need to be changed in the middle of the night. Most materials in the diaper are held together with a hot-melt adhesive, which is applied as a spray or in multiple lines. An elastic hot melt is also used to help with pad integrity when the diaper is wet.

Some disposable diapers include fragrance, lotions, or essential oils to help mask the smell of a soiled diaper or protect the skin. Care of disposable diapers is minimal, consisting primarily of keeping them dry before use and disposing of them in a garbage receptacle when soiled. Stool is supposed to be deposited in the toilet, but is generally put in the garbage with the rest of the diaper.

Buying the right size of disposable diaper can be a little difficult for first-time parents, since different brands have different sizing standards. Baby diaper sizes are generally based on the child's weight (kg or lbs) rather than age, unlike clothing or shoes.

Common disposable baby diaper brands in the US include Huggies, Pampers, and Luvs.

==== Sizing ====
Diaper Size	Baby Weight (lbs)	Baby weight (kg)	Approx Child Age
N	<10	<4	first few weeks only
1	8-14	3-6	2–4 months
2	12-18	5-8	3–6 months
3	16-28	7-13	6–10 months
4	22-37	9-17	7–17 months
5	<27	<12	older than 2 years
6	<35	<16	older than 3 years
7	<41	<19	older than 4 years
8	46+	21+	older than 5 years

=== Cloth diaper ===
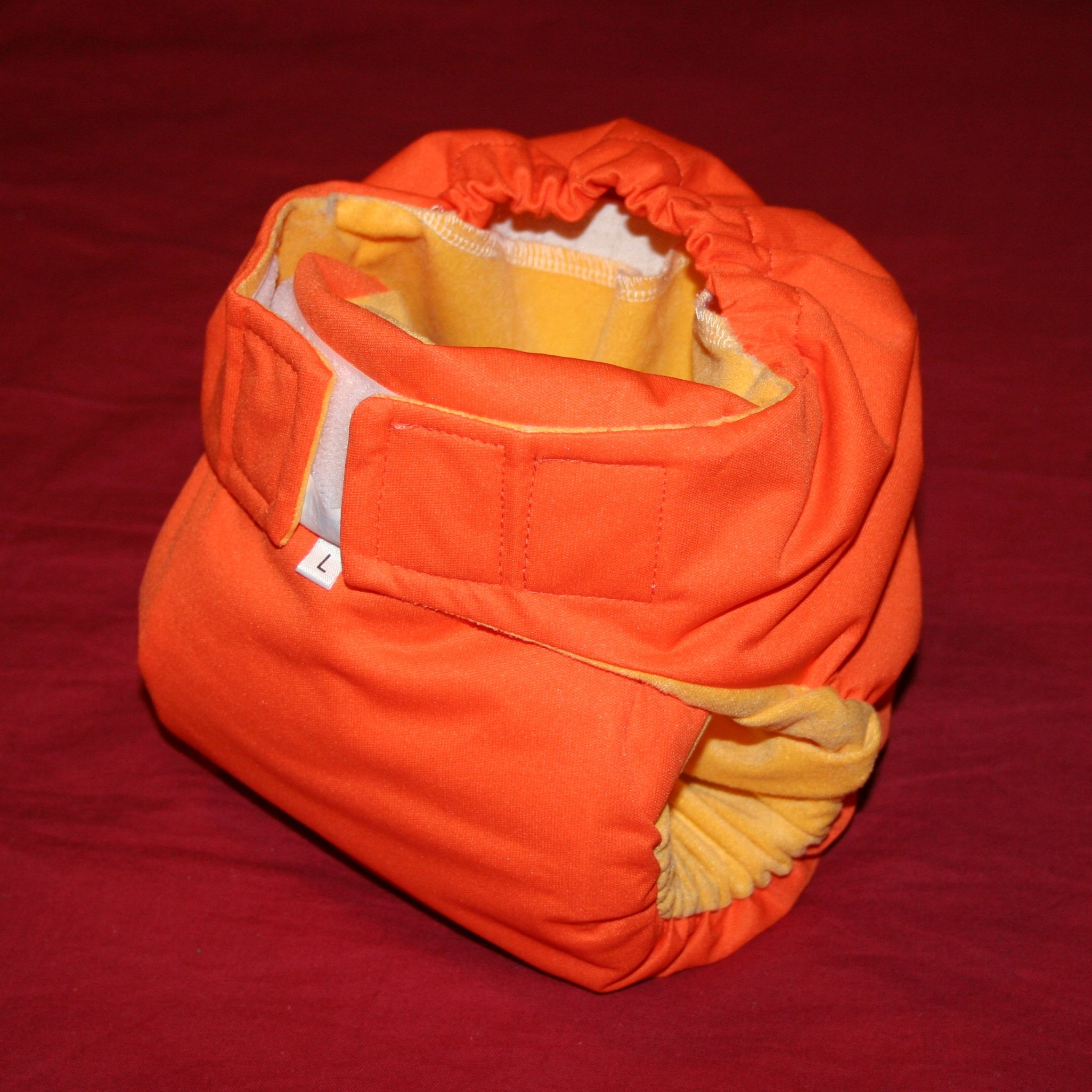
Cloth diaper filled with extra cloth

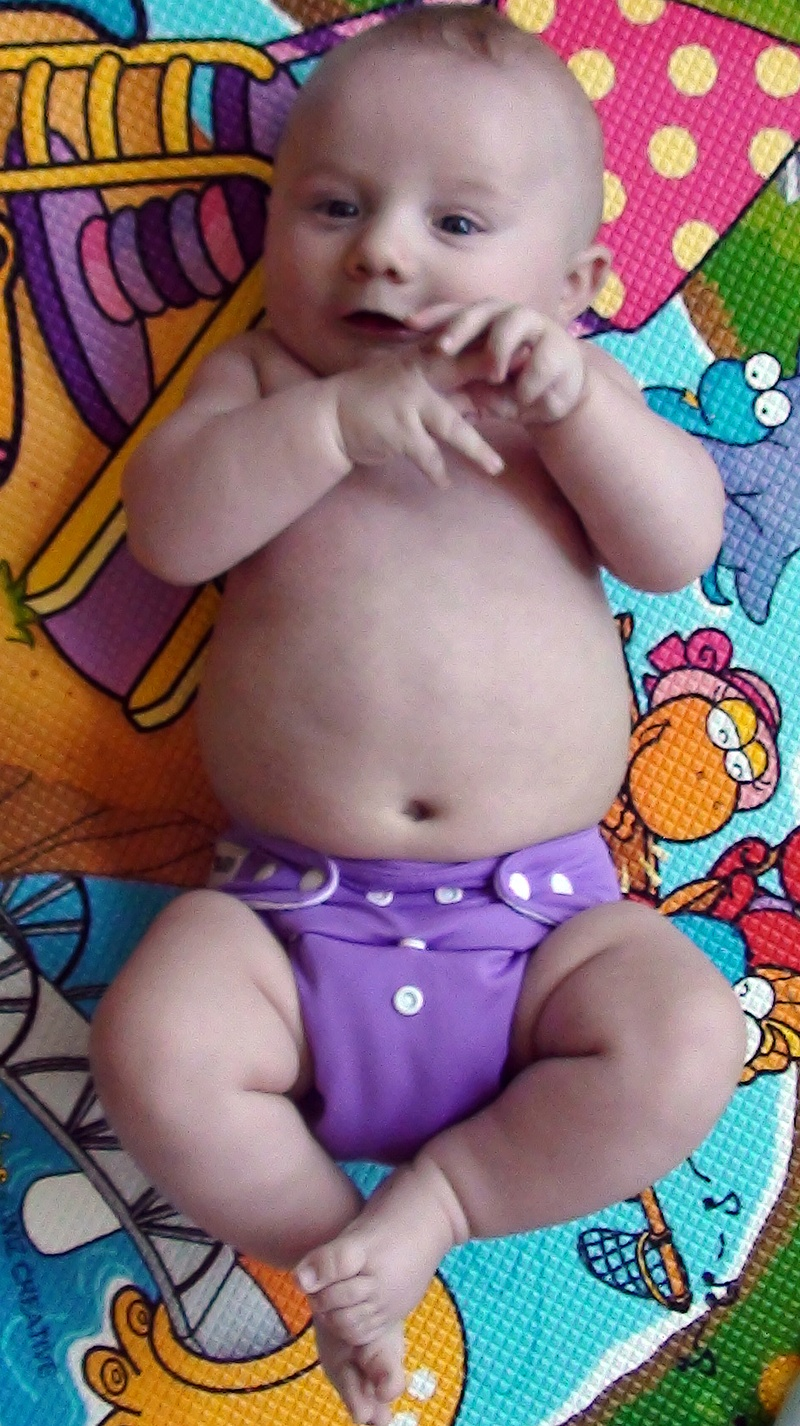
Baby with cloth diaper

Cloth diapers are reusable and can be made from natural fibers, synthetic materials, or a combination of both. They are often made from industrial cotton which may be bleached white or left the fiber's natural color. Other natural fiber cloth materials include wool, bamboo, and unbleached hemp. Artificial materials such as an internal absorbent layer of microfiber toweling or an external waterproof layer of polyurethane laminate (PUL) may be used. Polyester fleece and faux suedecloth are often used inside cloth diapers as a "stay-dry" wicking liner because of the non-absorbent properties of those synthetic fibers.

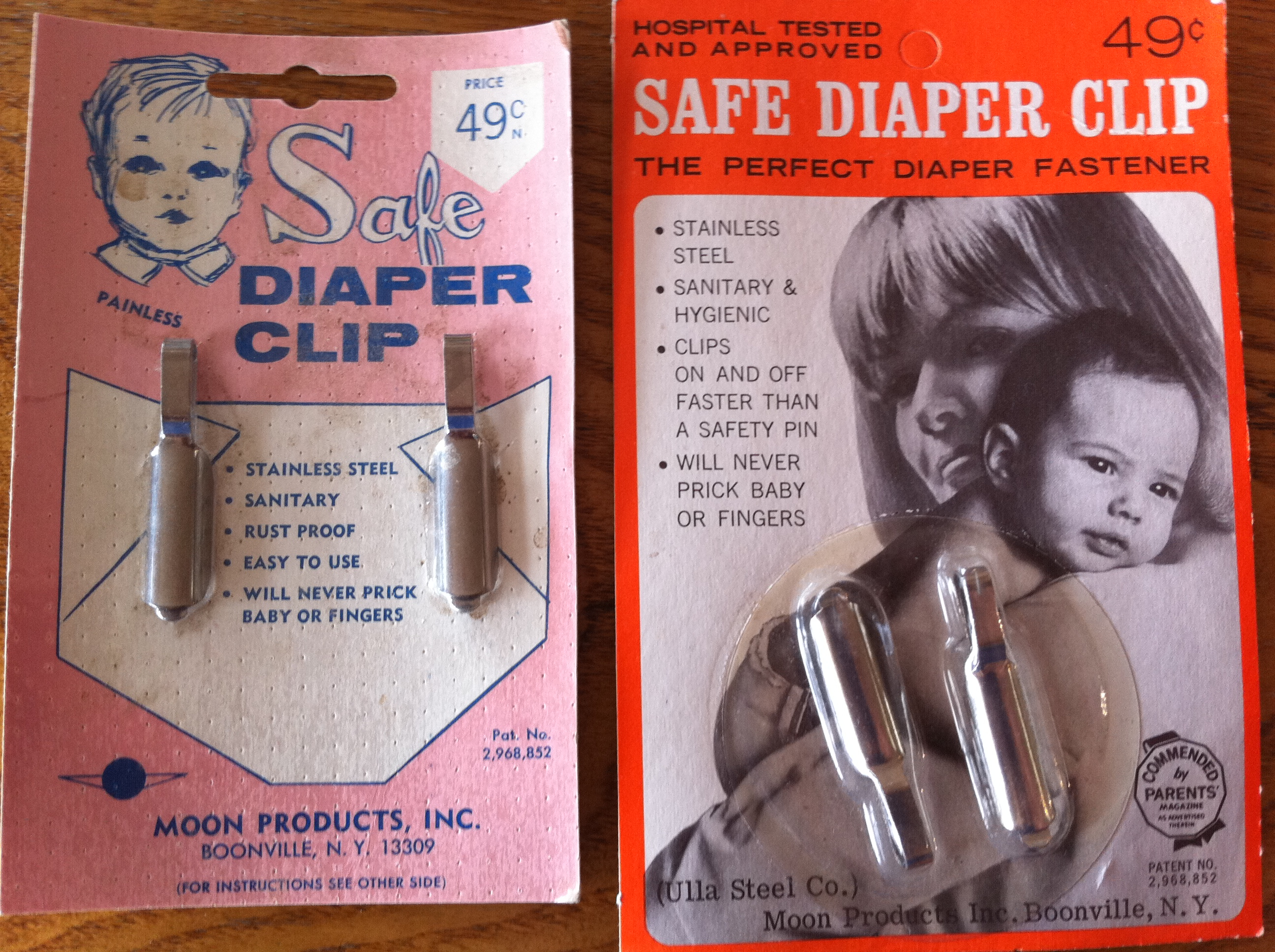
Safe Diaper Clip from the mid-1960s

Traditionally, cloth diapers consisted of a folded square or rectangle of cloth, fastened with safety pins. Today, most cloth diapers are fastened with hook-and-loop tape (Velcro) or snaps.

Modern cloth diapers come in a host of shapes, including preformed cloth diapers, all-in-one diapers with waterproof exteriors, fitted diapers with covers, and pocket or "stuffable" diapers, which consist of a water-resistant outer shell with an opening for absorbent inserts. Many design features of modern cloth diapers have followed directly from innovations initially developed in disposable diapers, such as the use of the hour glass shape, materials to separate moisture from skin and the use of double gussets, or an inner elastic band for better fit and containment of waste material. Several cloth diaper brands use variations of Procter & Gamble's original 1973 patent use of a double gusset in Pampers.

=== Compostable diapers ===
Compostable diapers can be made from a range of different plant-based materials. Dyper makes their compostable diapers from bamboo fibers.

== Usage ==
=== Children ===
Babies may have their diapers changed five or more times a day. Parents and other primary childcare givers often carry spare diapers and necessities for diaper changing in a specialized diaper bag. Diapering may serve as a good bonding experience for parent and child. Children who wear diapers may experience skin irritation, commonly referred to as diaper rash, due to continual contact with fecal matter, as feces contains urease, which catalyzes the conversion of the urea in urine to ammonia, which can irritate the skin and cause painful redness.

The age at which children should stop wearing diapers regularly and begin toilet training is a subject of debate. Proponents of baby-led potty training and Elimination Communication argue that potty training can begin at birth, offering multiple benefits, with diapers used only as a backup. Keeping children in diapers beyond infancy can be controversial, with family psychologist John Rosemond claiming it is a "slap to the intelligence of a human being that one would allow baby to continue soiling and wetting himself past age two." Pediatrician T. Berry Brazelton, however, believes that toilet training is the child's choice and has encouraged this view in various commercials for Pampers Size 6, a diaper for older children. Brazelton warns that enforced toilet training can cause serious long-term problems, and that it is the child's decision when to stop wearing diapers, not the parents'.

Children typically achieve daytime continence and stop wearing diapers during the day between the ages of two and four, depending on culture, diaper type, parental habits, and the child's personality. However, it is becoming increasingly common for children five to eleven years old to still wear diapers during the day, due to the child's opposition to toilet training, neglect, or unconventional parenting techniques. Other children may use diapers past toileting age due to disability, developmental disorders, or other medical reasons. This can pose many problems if the child is sent to school wearing diapers, including teasing from classmates and health issues resulting from soiled diapers. There has been recent pushback from teachers concerning a trend of more children in diapers. If a child soils themselves or their diaper, the teacher has to stop the lesson to focus on one child, which is distracting and takes away from the learning environment.

Most children continue to wear diapers at night for a period after daytime continence is achieved. Older children may have problems with bladder control (primarily at night) and may wear diapers while sleeping to control bedwetting. Approximately 16% of children in the U.S. over the age of 5 wet the bed, 5% of children over 10 wet the bed, and 2% of children over 15 wet the bed. Some companies have diaper products specifically designed for bedwetting, traditionally hosting higher leak guards, and being pull on style similar to training pants. If bedwetting becomes a concern, the current recommendation is to consider forgoing a night diaper, as it may prevent the child from getting out of bed. However, this is not a primary cause of bedwetting. This is particularly the case for children over the age of 8.

==== Training pants ====
Manufacturers have designed "training pants" that bridge the gap between baby diapers and regular underwear during toilet training. These are similar to infant diapers in construction, but they can be pulled on like normal underwear. Training pants are available for children who experience enuresis.

=== Adults ===
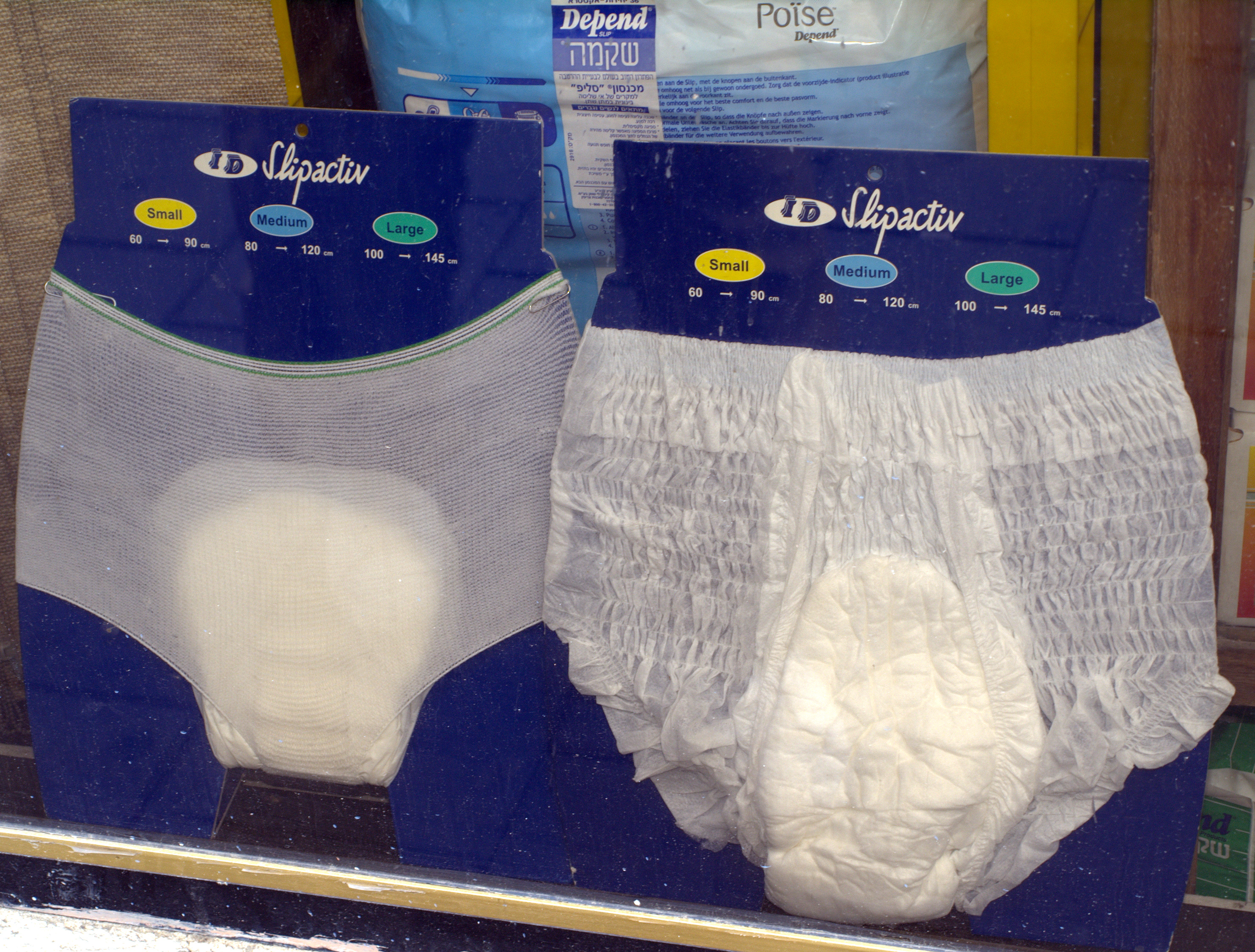
Adult diapers may be worn for urinary and fecal incontinence.

Although most commonly worn by babies and children, diapers are also worn by adults for various reasons. In the medical community, they are usually referred to as "adult absorbent briefs" rather than "diapers", which are associated with children and may carry a negative connotation. The usage of adult diapers can be a source of embarrassment, and products are often marketed under euphemisms such as incontinence pads.

The most common adult users of diapers are those with medical conditions that cause them to experience urinary incontinence (like bedwetting) or fecal incontinence, those who are bedridden or otherwise limited in their mobility, or those who have other emotional, physical, or mental needs. It is important that the user selects the appropriate type, size, and absorbency level for their needs, as each diaper design differs. Adult diapers also see, in very rare instances, use for roleplay, coping, sexual, and combination thereof purposes by for example, but not limited to, diaper fetishists and adult babies.

Scuba divers utilize diapers for their dry suits for long exposures. The Maximum Absorbency Garment is an adult-sized diaper with extra absorption material designed to retain 2 liters that NASA astronauts wear during liftoff, landing, and extra-vehicular activity (EVA).

=== Animals ===
Diapers and diaper-like products are sometimes used on pets, laboratory animals, or working animals. This is often due to the animal not being housebroken, or for older, sick, or injured pets who have become incontinent. In some cases, these are simply baby diapers with holes cut for the tails to fit through. In other cases, they are diaper-like waste collection devices.

The diapers used on primates, canines, etc., are much like the diapers used by humans. The diapers used on equines are intended to catch excretions rather than absorb them.

In 2002, the Vienna city council proposed requiring horses to wear diapers to prevent them from defecating in the street. This caused controversy amongst animal rights groups, who claimed that wearing diapers would be uncomfortable for the animals. The campaigners protested by lining the streets wearing diapers themselves, which spelled out the message "Stop pooh bags". In the Kenyan town of Limuru, donkeys were also diapered at the council's behest. A similar scheme in Blackpool ordered that horses be fitted with rubber and plastic diapers to stop them littering the promenade with dung. The council consulted the RSPCA to ensure that the diapers did not harm the horses' welfare.

Other animals that are sometimes diapered include female dogs when ovulating and thus bleeding, as well as monkeys and apes, and chickens. Diapers are often seen on trained animals who appear on TV shows, in movies, or for live entertainment or educational appearances.

== Cost of disposable diapers ==
More than US$9 billion is spent on disposable diapers in North America each year.

As of 2018, name-brand, mid-range disposable diapers in the U.S., such as Huggies and Pampers, were sold at an average price of $0.20–0.30 each, and their manufacturers earned about two cents in profit per diaper. Premium brands had eco-friendly features and sold for approximately twice that price. Generic disposable diapers cost less per diaper, at an average price of $0.15 each, and the typical manufacturer's profit was about one cent per diaper. However, the low-cost diapers needed to be changed more frequently, so the total cost savings were limited, as the lower cost per diaper was offset by the need to buy more diapers.

In Latin America, some manufacturers sold disposable diapers for approximately US$0.10 each.

== Environmental impact of cloth versus disposable diapers ==
An average child will go through several thousand diapers in their life. Since disposable diapers are discarded after a single use, usage of disposable diapers increases the burden on landfill sites, and increased environmental awareness has led to a growth in campaigns for parents to use reusable alternatives such as cloth or hybrid diapers. An estimated 27.4 billion disposable diapers are used each year in the US, resulting in a possible 3.4 million tons of used diapers adding to landfills each year. A discarded disposable diaper takes approximately 450 years to decompose.

The environmental impact of cloth as compared to disposable diapers has been studied several times. In a cradle-to-grave study sponsored by the National Association of Diaper Services (NADS) and conducted by Carl Lehrburger and colleagues, the results showed that disposable diapers produce seven times more solid waste when discarded and three times more waste during manufacturing. In addition, effluents from the plastic, pulp, and paper industries are believed far more hazardous than those from the cotton-growing and -manufacturing processes. Single-use diapers consume less water than reusables laundered at home, but more than those sent to a commercial diaper service. Washing cloth diapers at home uses 50 to 70 gallons (approx. 189 to 264 litres) of water every three days, which is roughly equivalent to flushing the toilet 15 times a day, unless the user has a high-efficiency washing machine. An average diaper service puts its diapers through an average of 13 water changes, but uses less water and energy per diaper than one laundry load at home.

In October 2008, "An updated lifecycle assessment study for disposable and reusable nappies" by the UK Environment Agency and Department for Environment, Food and Rural Affairs stated that reusable diapers can cause significantly less (up to 40 percent) or significantly more damage to the environment than disposable ones, depending mostly on how parents wash and dry them. The "baseline scenario" showed that the difference in greenhouse emissions was insignificant (in fact, disposables even scored slightly better). However, much better results (emission cuts of up to 40 percent) could be achieved by using reusable diapers more rationally. "The report shows that, in contrast to the use of disposable nappies, it is consumers' behaviour after purchase that determines most of the impacts from reusable nappies. Cloth nappy users can reduce their environmental impacts by:

- Line drying outside whenever possible
- Tumble drying as little as possible
- When replacing appliances, choosing more energy efficient appliances (A+ rated machines [according to the EU environmental rating] are preferred)
- Not washing above 60 °C (140 °F)
- Washing fuller loads
- Using baby-led potty training techniques to reduce the number of soiled nappies.
- Reusing nappies on other children."

Variations in cloth diaper care can account for differences in environmental impact. For example, using a cloth diaper laundering service involves additional pollution from the vehicle that picks up and drops off deliveries. Yet such a service uses less water per diaper in the laundering process. Some people who launder cloth diapers at home wash each load twice, considering the first wash a "prewash", and thus doubling the energy and water usage from laundering. Cloth diapers are most commonly made of cotton. "Conventional cotton is one of the most chemically-dependent crops, sucking up 10% of all agricultural chemicals and 25% of insecticides on 3% of our arable land; that's more than any other crop per unit." This effect can be mitigated by using organic cotton or other materials, such as bamboo and hemp.

Another aspect to consider when choosing between disposable diapers and cloth diapers is cost. It is estimated that an average baby will use $1,500 to $2,000 or more worth of disposable diapers before being potty trained. In contrast, cloth diapers, while initially more expensive than disposables, if bought new, cost about $100 to $300 for a basic set, although costs can rise with more expensive versions. The cost of washing and drying diapers must also be considered. The basic set, if one size, can last from birth through potty training.

Another factor in the impact of reusable cloth diapers is their ability to be reused for subsequent children or resold. These factors can mitigate the environmental and financial impacts of manufacturing, selling, and using brand-new reusable diapers.

== See also ==
- Changing table
- Diaper bag
- Infant clothing
- Swim diaper
- Diaper Genie
- Baby-led potty training
- Diaper fetishism
- Marion Donovan
- Training pants
