= Marion Donovan =

American inventor (1917–1998)

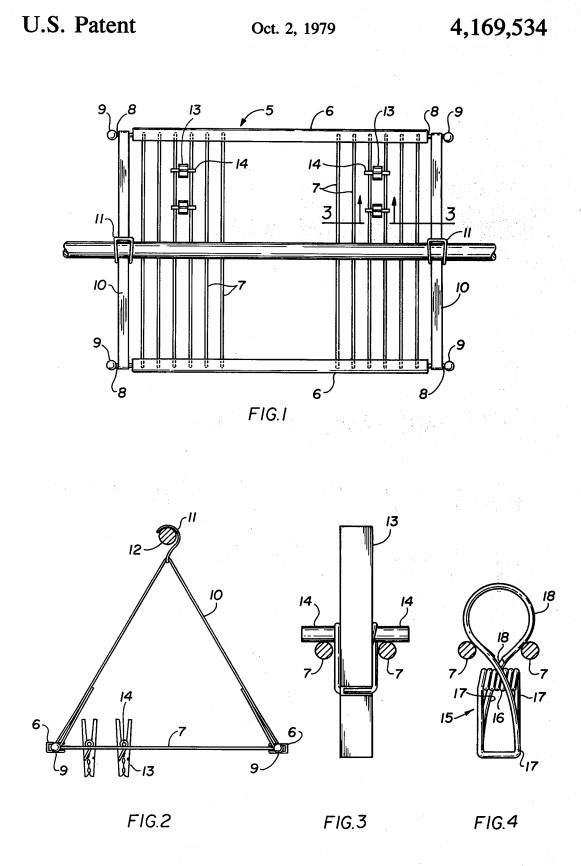
- One of Donovan's patents
- Born: Marion O'Brien; October 15, 1917; South Bend, Indiana, US
- Died: November 4, 1998 (aged 81); New York City, US
- Education: Rosemont College (BA); Yale University (MArch)
- Known for: First waterproof diaper
- Awards: National Inventors Hall of Fame

Marion O'Brien Donovan (October 15, 1917 – November 4, 1998) was an American inventor and entrepreneur. Recognized as one of the era's most prominent female inventors, she secured a total of 20 patents for her creations. In 1946, she created a reusable, impermeable diaper cover. Ultimately, this led to the invention of the disposable paper diaper, which was eventually commercialized by Victor Mills, the creator of Pampers. Donovan also innovated various solutions around the home and was inducted into the National Inventors Hall of Fame in 2015.

== Early life and education ==
Donovan was born on October 15, 1917, in South Bend, Indiana, to Anne and Miles O'Brien. Following the death of her mother in 1925, Donovan was parented by her father. With his identical twin brother John, Miles O'Brien ran the South Bend Lathe Works manufacturing plant. Donovan's father and uncle were inventors as well, credited with inventing products such as the "South Bend lathe" for developing automobile gears and gun barrels. Donovan spent most of her free time in their manufacturing plant, where she learned the basics of machinery and engineering. Her father even helped her produce her very first invention, a tooth powder, as a child.

At the age of 22, Donovan earned her B.A. in English from Rosemont College in Pennsylvania. Nineteen years later, as one of the three women in her graduating class, Donovan earned a master's degree in architecture from Yale University.

After graduation, Donovan was employed as an Assistant Beauty Editor at Vogue magazine in New York. Eventually, she resigned to start a family with leather importer James F. Donovan, and moved to Westport, Connecticut. She had three children with Donovan (Christine Donovan, Sharon Dodd Donovan, and James F. Donovan). She divorced Donovan in the 1970s and married John F. Butler in 1981.

== Invention of the "Boater" ==
Motherhood gave Donovan good reason to revive the innovative instincts of her own childhood. Frustrated by the repetitive tasks of changing her daughters cloth diapers, clothing, and bedsheets, Donovan wondered if she could create a more practical solution for preventing diaper leakage.

She began experimenting in her attic with various materials and this eventually led her to repurpose a lightweight shower curtain to craft a waterproof diaper cover. She called this invention the "Boater", because it helps babies to "stay afloat". This design got rid of the standard rubber pants of the era by using breathable yet leak resistant fabric. This design also allowed for snap fasteners instead of safety pins, reducing risk of accidental pricks. These improvements also did not constrict the baby. The design created a pouch for the diaper insert, keeping the wet diaper away from the baby. The final product was actually made from nylon parachute cloth as the material allowed the baby's skin to breathe. When Donovan attempted to sell the "Boater" to top manufacturers, it was rejected. Therefore, she went into manufacturing herself.

The diaper covers' debut came at New York's Saks Fifth Avenue in 1949. It was an immediate hit. Store managers could not keep the shelves stocked. Thus, sales increased, revealing a strong market demand for a product that greatly reduced laundry loads and improved infant hygiene.

Donovan's patent was granted in 1951. In that same year, she sold her company and the rights to Keko Corp for $1 million. By that time, she was developing a new idea beyond her waterproof cloth diaper covers. It was an even more essential innovation: the disposable paper diaper. She needed to fashion a special type of paper that was not only strong and absorbent, but also conveyed water away from the baby's skin to avoid any rash. After much experimentation, Donovan designed a disposable diaper that aimed to further solve the problem of leaking diapers.

However, Donovan did not have instant success with her innovation. She took her finished product to every large manufacturer in the country, but no one was interested. She was laughed at by U.S. paper companies for proposing such an unnecessary and impractical item. It wasn't until a decade later, in 1961, when Victor Mills, creator of Pampers, capitalized on Donovan's idea to produce fully disposable and more absorbent diapers. Today, it is estimated that 95% of babies in the U.S. wear disposable diapers.

Meanwhile, Donovan had returned to school to study architecture. She claimed she "always wanted to be an architect", as she was fascinated by structure. She earned a degree in architecture at Yale University in 1958. She was one of just three women in her graduating class. Donovan subsequently designed her own home in Greenwich, Connecticut in 1981.

Between the years of 1951 and 1996, Donovan earned 20 patents. The inventions were aimed to tackle practical problems in the home. The inventions included a facial tissue box (1953), towel dispenser (1957), hosiery clasp (1962), storage box (1966), closet organizer (1979), a soap dish, the "Zippity-Do", an elastic cord that connected over the shoulder to the zipper on the back of a dress, and the DentaLoop, a flossing product that, like her waterproof diaper covers, she chose to make and market herself. Thus, sales increased, revealing a strong market demand for a product that greatly reduced laundry loads and improved infant hygiene.

Using her home as her lab, and household items as her materials, Donovan proved that domestic settings can be places for innovation. She recognized common challenges in her life and used that understanding to innovate better solutions for others, with many of her inventions aimed especially for women.

== Death ==
Donovan died on November 4, 1998, from heart disease at the age of 81 at Lenox Hill Hospital in Manhattan.

== Honors ==
Donovan was elected to the National Inventors Hall of Fame in May 2015 and has a picture on the Hall of Fame wall.

== Bibliography ==
- Busch-Vishniac, Ilene; Busch, Lauren; Tietjen, Jill (2024). "Chapter 15. Marion Donovan". Women in the National Inventors Hall of Fame: The First 50 Years. Springer Nature. ISBN 9783031755255.
