= Les Djinns =

Les Djinns may refer to:

- Les Djinns (poem), 1829 poem by Victor Hugo
- Les djinns, Op. 12, choral work by Gabriel Fauré
- Les Djinns (Franck), FMV 45, 1884 symphonic poem by César Franck based on the Hugo poem
- Les djinns, Op. 35, 1912 symphonic poem by Louis Vierne
- Les Djinns (choir), French choral group of the 1960s

== See also ==
- Djinn (disambiguation)
