= Petunia Pickle Bottom =

American manufacturer of women's accessories

Coordinates: 34.276783°N 119.287161°W

- Industry: Women's accessories
- Founded: 2000; 26 years ago in Ventura, California
- Founder: Braden Jones; DeNai Jones; Korie Conant
- Headquarters: Thousand Oaks, California, United States
- Parent: Thrive International, Inc.
- Website: Official website

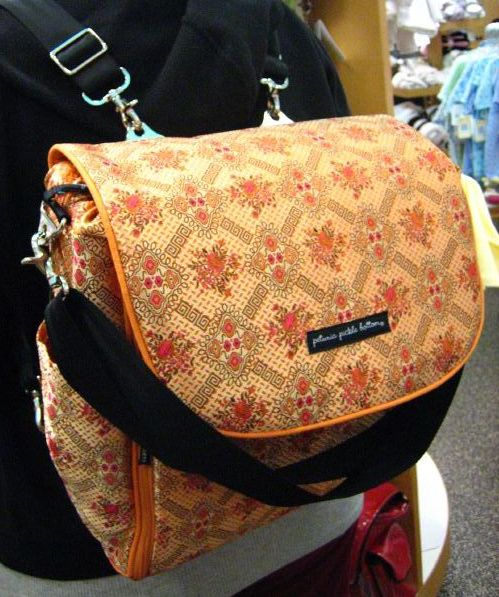
A Petunia Pickle Bottom bag, worn 2006

Petunia Pickle Bottom is an American manufacturer of diaper bags, handbags (branded only as "Petunia") and other women's accessories.

The company was founded in 2000 in Ventura, California by DeNai and Braden Jones together with Korie Conant. Its products became fashionable in the U.S. after being featured on Oprah Winfrey's talk show.
