= Lil Karhola Wettergren =

Swedish paper entrepreneur and executive

Dagmar Sigbritt Lil Karhola Wettergren (née Drangel; 20 May 1924 – 21 November 2008) was a Swedish entrepreneur. Her role in the creation of the paper diaper in the 1950s was noteworthy, as was her appointment as the first female board member in a Swedish public limited company, Husqvarna AB, in 1970.

== Biography ==
Lil Drangel was born on 20 May 1924 as the third child (all daughters) of Hugo Drangel and May Gustafson. She died on 21 November 2008 in Stockholm. In 1946 she married her co-student and lawyer Ola Wettergren (died in 1981), with whom she had four children. In 1981, she married Arvo Karhola, the vice president of the Finnish heavy manufacturer Tampella. The couple then settled in Helsinki. After her husband's death in 2003, she moved back to Sweden and Stockholm.

== Career ==
After studying law and clerkship (1946, Uppsala University), and work in the provincial government of Älvsborg County in Vänersborg, she moved with her husband to Stockholm in 1949 to work at Pauli's tissue mill.

Her father had worked in the paper mill since 1927 and subsequently transformed the old mechanical pulp mill to a paper tissue mill. The initiative came at the right time because of the shortage of cotton and bandages in Europe due to World War II. This combined with the shortage of both textiles and detergents gave birth to the idea of the paper diaper.

In 1956, Lil bought out Pauliström from the family and began producing paper diapers in Sweden's first diaper machine, which is constructed on the mill. Her own children served as test subjects for the new product.

During the period 1959–1965 she was president of the company, a pioneer in the male-dominated process industry.

Then she sold the company to Mo and Domsjö AB, which she continued to serve as head of Modo's tissue division. The overall male-dominated corporate culture made it difficult to accept her as a leader, and after a few years she resigned from the company to start her own company, Paper Lil AB.

In 1969 Lil Wettergren (the name of her husband) became the first female member (not belonging to the founding family) of the board of directors of a Swedish listed company, namely Husqvarna AB. At that time, the company was shifting away from the production of weapons at Husqvarna Vapenfabriks Aktiebolag to more "soft" products like sewing machines and white goods, with which the men on the board thought a woman as CEO would do well.

Following this job, she became a board member of the companies Abbas AB (1975–1986), MoDo (1976), Mo & Domsjö AB (1982–1991), and Gota Bank (1980–1991; first woman on a bank board).

In 1987 she wrote her memoirs in Fostrad till männens värld (Raised to the world of men; Fountain, ISBN 91-7160-820-6), about a woman's experiences in a male business world.

Between 1983 and 2003 she managed the family estate Horns Väsby.

Lil Karhola Wettergren died at the age of 84 years on 21 May 2008.
