= Diaper bag =

Bag with many pockets for carrying baby's necessities

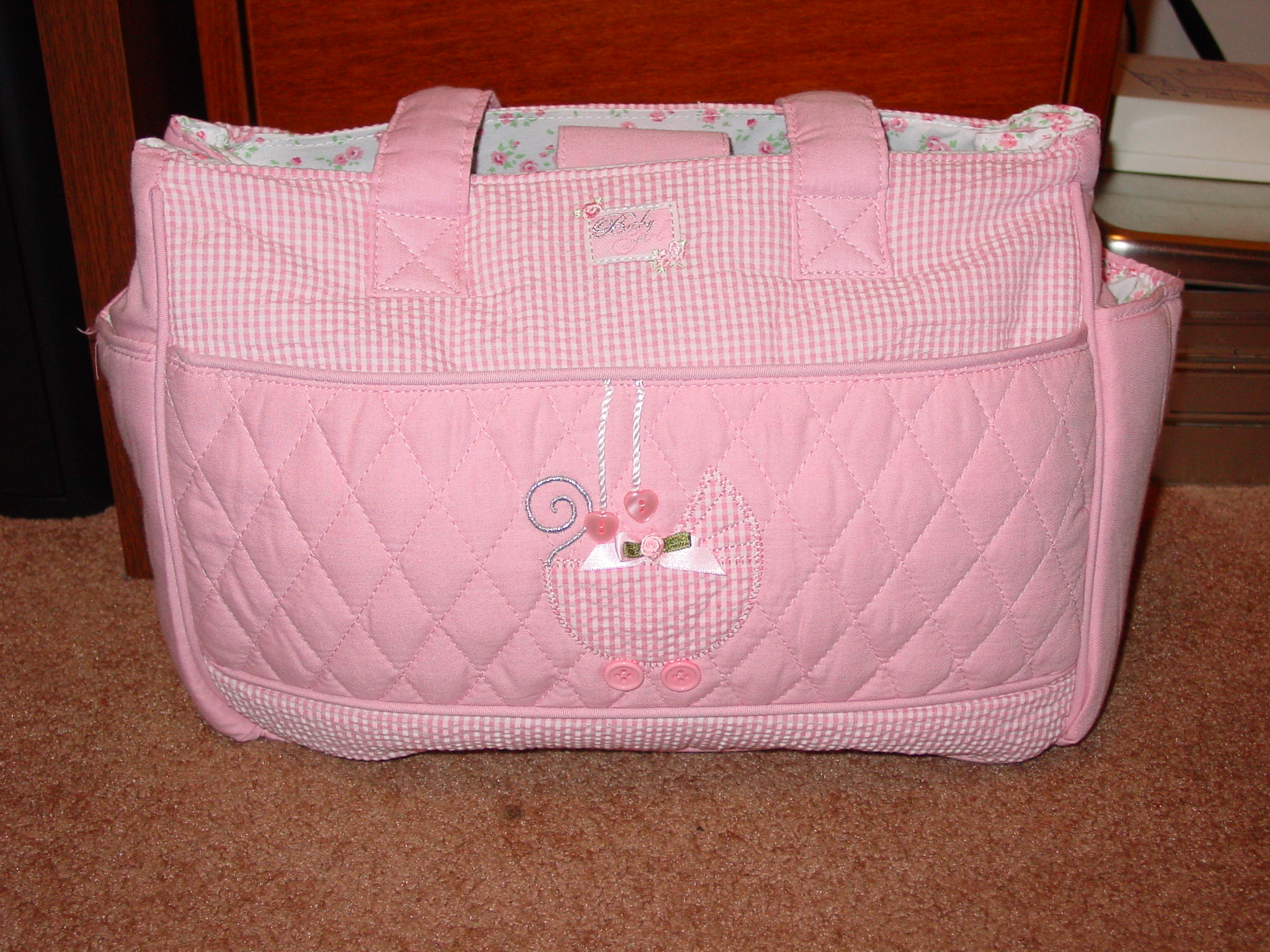
An over-the-shoulder diaper bag

A diaper bag or nappy bag is a storage bag with many pocket-like spaces that is big enough to carry everything needed by someone taking care of a baby while taking a typical short outing.

== Design ==
These bags are not always designed expressly as a diaper bag, as any well-pocketed bag sized in between a child's school backpack and adult pro-camping backpack can be used for the purpose. Some are now being made with rigid handles and wheels so that someone can cart one around, allowing that person to hold the baby more firmly, complete more tasks (like opening a door, paying a cashier, or using a phone), and reduce lower back pain. My Child magazine suggests a brightly colored diaper bag is harder to lose and can help combat the "baby blues".

Designs without bright colors or licensed characters can be high-fashion items associated with celebrity mothers. Companies also produce diaper bags with a more rugged look, as part of a growing sector of the baby-products market designed to appeal to men. These bags often feature darker colors, more streamlined designs, and materials such as leather or waxed canvas. As more and more fathers take an active role in caring for their children, these bags provide a practical and stylish option for dads on the go.

Diaper bags are generally small enough to fit on or under a stroller or buggy. There have been fashion trends against large bags, as mothers learn to reduce the number of necessities carried.

Since the 21st-century, there has been an "explosion of styles, colors, designs, and functions." Diaper bags have helped fashion designers make their mark. Since 2005, some premium designers such as Kate Spade, Coach, and Ralph Lauren have launched expensive diaper bag designs. According to Fortune in 2006, "To gain an edge, smart manufacturers are doing whatever it takes to capture the attention (and aesthetics) of today's chic parents-to-be who are willing - sometimes even eager - to pay top dollar for products that seamlessly blend fashion and function." Luxury diaper bags continue to be sold as of 2021.

== Around the world ==
In Germany one of the biggest manufacturers of diaper bags is LÄSSIG GmbH.

== Company disputes ==
Designers can be protective of their diaper bag designs and trademarks. In 1977, diaper bags were the cause of a New York court case between Macy's and Gucci. The court found that Macy's had infringed on Gucci's trademark by selling diaper bags with green and red bands and the wording "Gucchi Goo."

== See also ==
- Petunia Pickle Bottom
