= Les Djinns (Franck) =

Symphonic poem by César Franck

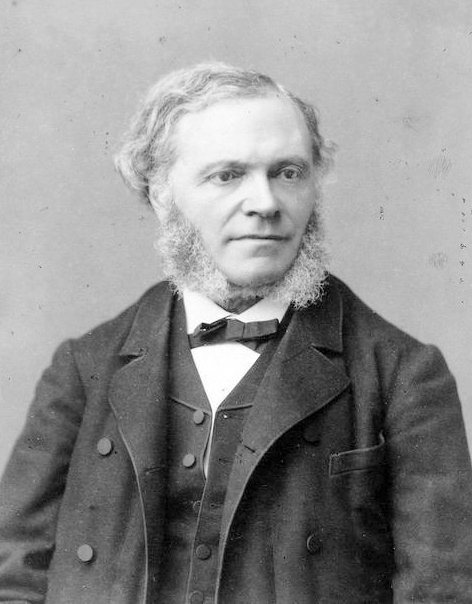
César Franck, photographed by Pierre Petit, 1887

Les Djinns FWV 45 is a symphonic poem for piano and orchestra by César Franck.

== Composition ==
The pianist Caroline Montigny-Rémaury had asked for a short piano and orchestra piece, but she never played the work that Franck composed in the summer of 1884. It was premiered 15 March 1885 by Louis Diémer as the pianist, in a concert at the Société Nationale de Musique.

The work is inspired by the eponymous poem in Les Orientales by Victor Hugo. The latter often inspired Franck (melodies, and his first symphonic poem Ce qu'on entend sur la montagne, composed in 1847–1848, at the same time as the work by Franz Liszt from the same inspiration).

Franck takes up the idea of the mysterious and supernatural forces tearing the nocturnal sky through their passage, and especially the singular rhythm of Hugo's poem, rising from calm into a sonorous storm, before falling back into the silence of the night. The piano part is very virtuosic, and Franck so liked Diémer's interpretation of this difficult score that he wrote his Variations symphoniques for Diémer, also for piano and orchestra, marking Franck's renewed interest in this instrument.
