= Jinni (disambiguation) =

A jinni or genie is a spirit mentioned in Islamic theology.

Jinni may also refer to:

== People ==
- Jini (singer) (Choi Yun-jin), former member of K-Pop group Nmixx
- Jinni Featherstone-Witty, member of the winning 2000 Roehampton Trophy polo team
- Jinni Mondejar, volleyball player for San Sebastian Stags

== Other uses ==
- Jinni (search engine), a former search and recommendation engine
- Jinni (film), a 2010 Maldivian horror film
- Jinni, a 2000 album by DMBQ

== See also ==
- Umm Jinni, one of the Hawar Islands of Bahrain
- Jini, network architecture for the construction of distributed systems
- Jinny (disambiguation)
- Jinn (disambiguation)
- Djinn (disambiguation)
