= Ernest Fouinet =

French novelist and poet

Ernest Fouinet (1799, Nantes – 1845, Paris) was a 19th-century French novelist and poet.

== Biography ==
A member of the Société Asiatique of Paris, Fouinet, who was employed at the Ministry of Finance, employed his bureaucratic leisure to translate into French, Arabic, Sanskrit, Malay, etc. poetry and prose, as well as English masterpieces, and collaborated with the Cent-et-un, la France littéraire, the Annales romantiques, the Keepsakes.

He then relaxed from his scholarly studies of Oriental languages, by composing romantic short stories and books for youth. Victor Hugo, who owes him translations from Arabic and Persian quoted in several notes of his Orientales, paid hommage to his poetic talent, as well as Sainte-Beuve, by dedicating him one of his best Consolations.

== Works ==
- 1824: Psara, élégie épique, Paris, Delaunay.
- 1832: La Stréga, Paris, Silvestre; reprint Geneva, Slatkine Reprints, 1973, available on Gallica.
- 1836: La Caravane des morts, Paris, Masson and Duprey.
- 1836: Roch le corsaire, Paris, Masson and Duprey.
- 1837: Allan ou le Jeune déporté à Botany-Bay, Limoges, F. F. Ardant frères, prix Monthyon 1837, available on Gallica.
- 1838: L'Enfant de trois mères, Paris, Desforges.
- 1838: Le Village sous les sables, Paris, Masson and Duprey.
- 1839: L’Île des Cinq avec une préface sur les livres d’éducation, Paris, Desforges et Cie, available on Gallica.
- 1843: Églises et châteaux, Paris, bureau du Journal des jeunes personnes.
- 1845: La Salle d’asile au bord de la mer, Tours, Alfred Mame and Cie, available on Gallica.
- 1844–1845: Les Douze nations, Paris, D. Eymery.
- 1846: Le Maître d'école de Montigny, Tours, Alfred Mame et Cie.
- 1846: Sœur Marie l’Égyptienne, Nancy, Hinzelin.
- 1848: Donato et sa lanterne magique, Paris et Limoges, M. Ardant.
- 1850: Mœurs, caractères et costumes, Paris, Fayé.
- 1835: Le Robinson des glaces, Paris, Eymery, 1835, available on Gallica.
- 1855: Les Anémones du roi Noman, Tours, Alfred Mame et Cie, available on Gallica.
- 1842: Gerson ou le manuscrit aux enluminures, Tours, Mame et Cie, prix Monthyon 1843, available on Gallica.
- 1859: Souvenirs de voyage : en Suisse, en Espagne, en Écosse, en Grèce, en Océanie, en Chine, en Perse, en Égypte, aux Antilles, dans l’Inde et dans l’Amérique; récits du Capitaine Kernoël, Paris, Didier.
- 1879: Exil et Repentir, Limoges, Ardant.

== Sources ==
- Antoine Laporte, Bibliographie contemporaine : histoire littéraire du dix-neuvième siècle, Paris F. Vieweg, 1888, (p. 18).
- Ferdinand Natanael Staaff, La Littérature française depuis la formation de la langue jusqu'à nos jours : auteurs enlevés à la littérature depuis la Restauration (1830–1869), Paris, Didier et Cie, 1874, (p. 1045).
- Pierre Larcher, Autour des Orientales. Victor Hugo, Ernest Fouinet et la poésie arabe archaïque, Bulletin d'Études Orientales, tome 62, 2013 [année de tomaison], (p. 99–123), Beyrouth, Institut Français du Proche-Orient, 2014.
