= Jind (disambiguation) =

Jind may refer to:

- Jind, a city in Haryana, India
  - Jind district
  - Jind State, a former princely state
  - Jind (Vidhan Sabha constituency)
- Jind Kaur (c. 1817–1863), ruler of the Sikh Empire

== See also ==
- Jinn (disambiguation), mythical creatures in Islam
