= Djinn (disambiguation) =

Djinn are supernatural creatures mentioned in Islamic theology.

Djinn, Djin, or Djinni may also refer to:

== Film ==
- Djinn (2013 film), an Emirati film by Tobe Hooper
- Djinn (2022 film), 2022 Indian Malayalam-language fantasy drama film by Sidharth Bharathan
- Djinns (film), a 2010 French-Moroccan film
- Djinn, a character from Clash of the Titans

== Music ==
- Djinn (album), an album by Melechesh
- Djin (album), an album by Queenadreena

== Other uses ==
- Djinn (comics), a bande dessinée by Jean Dufaux and Ana Mirallès
- Djinn (novel), a novel by Alain Robbe-Grillet
- Djinni (Dungeons & Dragons), a type of creature from Dungeons & Dragons
- Djinn (Golden Sun), creatures in the video game Golden Sun
- Sud-Ouest Djinn, a French light helicopter
- Djinn chair, a design in Modernist style by Olivier Mourgue

== See also ==
- Genie (disambiguation)
- Geni (disambiguation)
- Genies in popular culture
- Jinni (disambiguation)
- Les Djinns (disambiguation)
