= Diaper Genie =

Diaper disposal device

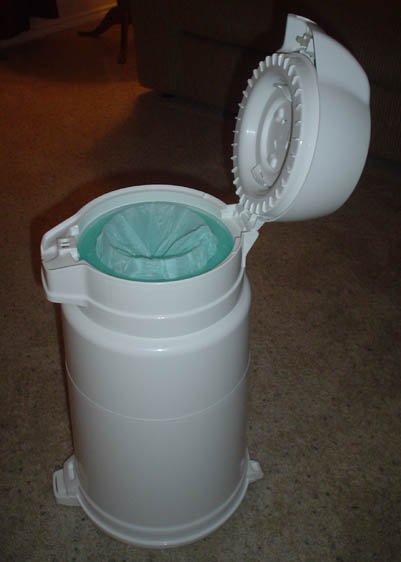
A Diaper Genie.

Diaper Genie is a baby diaper disposal system. It consists of a large plastic container with a plastic lid. The system seals diapers individually in a scented film to protect against germs and odors. By opening the lid on the top of the canister, a soiled diaper may be inserted into the "mouth" of the container. After inserting the diaper, the lid is replaced and twisted three full rotations to seal the diaper inside. When the container is filled with dirty diapers, it can be emptied by unlatching the bottom of the canister, where the diapers fall out still individually sealed. The resulting string of sealed diapers is colloquially known as a "diaper sausage."

The product was initially a creation of British inventors (currently marketed under the name "Sangenic" by Mayborn in the UK), and was brought to prominence in the US in the mid-1990s.

Diaper Genie is a brand of Playtex Products, Inc., which bought the Diaper Genie business from Mondial Industries L.P. in 1999.
