= Les Orientales =

Poems collection by Victor Hugo

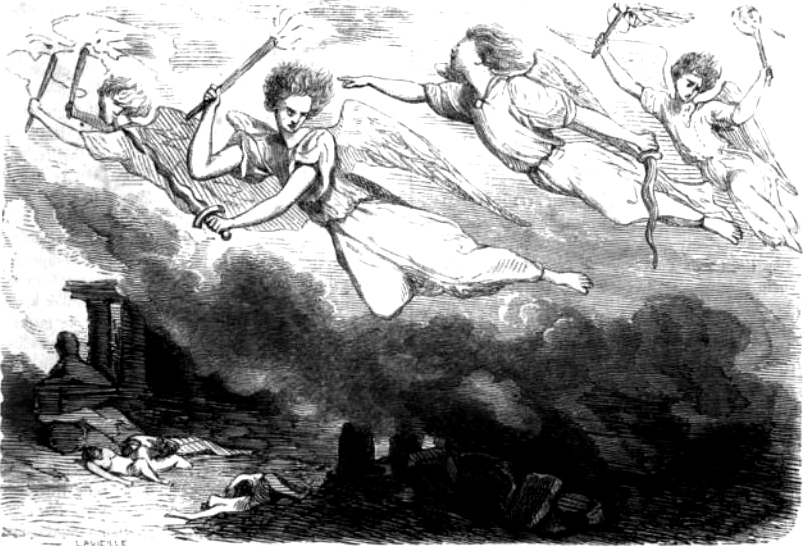
Illustration by Gérard Seguin, 1854

Les Orientales (French pronunciation: [lez‿ɔʁjɑ̃tal]) is a collection of poems by Victor Hugo, inspired by the Greek War of Independence. They were first published in January 1829.

Of the forty-one poems, thirty-six were written during 1828. They offer a series of highly coloured tableaux depicting scenes from the eastern Mediterranean that, reflecting the cultural and political bias of the French public, underscore the contrast between freedom-loving Greeks and imperialist Ottoman Turks. The fashionable subject ensured the book's success.

One reason this collection is notable is that it introduced the pantoum, a Malay poetic form, to European audiences. Hugo featured an unrhymed pantoum written by Ernest Fouinet in the notes section of the book, and subsequent French poets began to attempt their own original pantoum compositions.

Although Hugo described it as "this impractical book of pure poetry" (ce livre inutile de poesie pure), the general theme of the poems is a celebration of liberty, linking the Ancient Greeks with the modern world, freedom in politics with freedom in art, and reflecting the evolution of Hugo's political views from the royalism of his early twenties to a rediscovery of the Napoleonic enthusiasms of his childhood (for example, see the fortieth, Lui). The poems are also intended to undermine the classicists' exclusive claim on antiquity.

The depiction of Turks in Les Orientales mixes condemnation, idealisation, and crude envy. It is often cited as an example of the "Orientalist" attitudes typical of French literature.

The thirty-fourth poem of Les Orientales is "Mazeppa". This poem, written in May 1828, deals with the legendary story of Ivan Mazepa who was punished because he was caught in a love affair with a Polish nobleman's wife. The poem is organized in two parts: the first one is about Mazeppa's physical travel across the plains of Russia, strapped naked on the horse's back, until its death. The second part is about his spiritual travel to get back to life, and has been described as a kind of allegory of the creative process: "He races, he flies, he falls. He rises again, king". The poem cites Lord Byron (author of the narrative poem Mazeppa) and is dedicated to Louis Boulanger, who painted Byron's version. All the works ultimately derive from the cultural legacy of Mazeppa.

== Contents ==
1. "Le feu du ciel"
2. "Canaris"
3. "Les têtes du sérail"
4. "Enthousiasme"
5. "Navarin"
6. "Cri de guerre du mufti"
7. "La douleur du pacha"
8. "Chanson de pirates"
9. "La captive"
10. "Clair de lune"
11. "Le voile"
12. "La sultane favorite"
13. "Le derviche"
14. "Le château-fort"
15. "Marche turque"
16. "La bataille perdue"
17. "Le ravin"
18. "L'enfant"
19. "Sara la baigneuse"
20. "Attente"
21. "Lazzara"
22. "Vœu"
23. "La ville prise"
24. "Adieux de l’hôtesse arabe"
25. "Malédiction"
26. "Les tronçons du serpent"
27. "Nourmahal-la-Rousse"
28. "Les Djinns"
29. "Sultan Achmet"
30. "Romance mauresque"
31. "Grenade"
32. "Les Bleuets"
33. "Fantômes"
34. "Mazeppa"
35. "Le Danube en colère"
36. "Rêverie"
37. "Extase"
38. "Le Poëte au calife"
39. "Bounaberdi"
40. "Lui"
41. "Novembre"
