= Genie M. Smith =

American writer (1848–unknown)

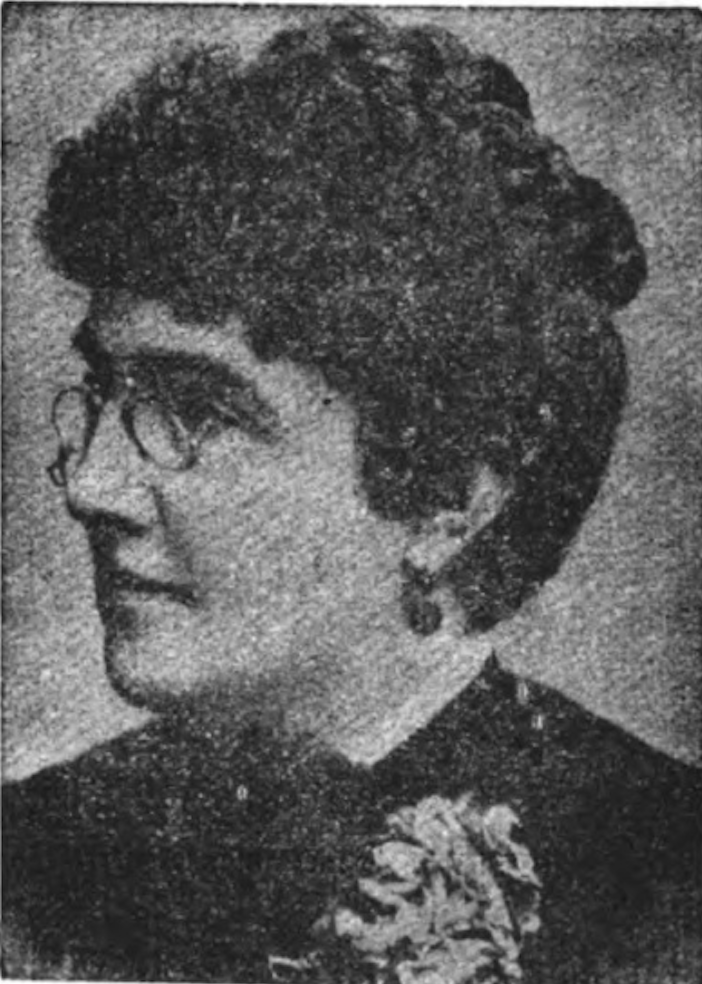
- Born: Emigene Moina Boyce; November 17, 1848; Fayston, Vermont, U.S.
- Died: Unknown
- Occupations: Writer, editor, poet
- Writing career
- Pen name: Maude Meredith, Kit Clover
- Genres: Local Color, feminist nonfiction

Genie M. Smith (né Emigene Moina Boyce; November 17, 1848 – unknown) was an American writer, editor, and poet who earned widespread admiration from her contemporaries as one of "the best and brightest lady writers in America." Better known by her preferred pen name Maude Meredith, she was praised for her character, being regarded as a devoted and good mother. Her writing was known for its "wholly unaffected" style, marked by a strong moral vision, vivid imagination, originality in approach, and remarkable creative energy. Beyond her literary achievements, Smith became well known in Dubuque, Iowa, for her charitable spirit and constant willingness to support worthy causes. Though she rose to fame, she never actively sought it, and her modesty in the face of success was often remarked upon. As her admirers noted, "only a genius could wear such honors with the modesty that Maude Meredith does."

== Early life and family ==
Emigene Moina Boyce was born in Fayston, Vermont, on November 17, 1848. Genie was born to parents Ziba (father) and Sarah (mother) Boyce. On April 8, 1869, Boyce married Dwight T. Smith, a merchant, when she was 20 years old, and Dwight was 24. Their marriage took place shortly after the end of the American Civil War, during which Dwight May have served. After the birth of their daughter, Georgiana, the couple made Dubuque, Iowa, their permanent home. Dubuque is where Genie maintained her writing and editing career at a time when editorial roles were rare for women. She encouraged her daughter to pursue writing specifically poems from an early age just as she did, and Georgiana later became a writer under the pen name Ray Richmond. Records about Genie Smith's later life and the date of her death remain unknown and undocumented.

=== Family ===
Genie's marriage to Dwight T. Smith resulted in three children: Georgiana G. Smith, Dwight Everleigh Smith, and David C. Smith. Georgiana was born in Vermont in 1871, when Genie was 23 years old. Fifteen years following Georgiana's birth, after Dwight and Genie moved to Iowa, the couple welcomed twin boys – Dwight and David – in February 1886, when Genie was 37 years old. Georgiana studied music and painting at the Boston N.E. Conservatory. She was an editor of the juvenile department of a couple monthly publications and was a paid contributor of short stories of a few other publications; under her pen name Ray Richmond, she published two poems titled "Morning" and "Night". Georgiana died in an accident in 1890: she was seated in a buggy in front of her father's office when a runaway attached to a lumber wagon came down the Main Street extension. Georgia jumped directly between the horses and died in the impact. There is little information known about Dwight and David's lives, such as their schooling, travels, and even deaths. However, Dwight Everleigh and Genie's husband Dwight both died in the same year, 1902; Dwight T. Smith on June 4, 1902 and Dwight Everleigh Smith on October 21, 1902. David's death date is unknown, like Genie's.

== Literary career ==
=== Writing ===
Smith worked under three different pen names during her time as an author–including the name most know her by, Genie M. Smith. Other pen names she went by include "Kit Clover" and "Maud(e) Meredith," which was her preferred name that she often used in public. Her stories were published in multiple newspapers and publications. Some of them include the Chicago Daily Tribune, Catholic Columbian Newspaper, Midland Monthly, The Broad Ax, The Conservative, and New York Weekly Mercury: a Journal of American Literature. Her novel, Winsome But Wicked, survives today in the Canonge Library.

=== Editing ===
In addition to writing, Smith worked as an editor. Her earliest known editing work was on the 1884 magazine titled the Mid-Continent. A column in The Woman's Tribune notes that Smith's contribution to the magazine was significant, and that in addition to editing, she was also a publisher and business manager for the magazine. In 1885, she was reported to have been an editor for over five different publications. From 1886 to 1888, she edited the Housekeeper, and is credited with providing the magazine with its "extensive reputation".

== Literary style and themes ==
=== Genres ===
Smith's fiction stories have been labeled as Local Color works, and adhere to that genre's typical themes on early 20th century American life. Many of her works use dialects from the North Midland and Upper Midwest regions of the U.S., making the common people from these regions the focus of her stories. Smith's contribution to regionalism has been recognized by scholars as substantial, particularly in regard to her short stories.

Beyond her fiction works, Smith also wrote a series of advice columns across different publications. Her essays commonly focused on parenting advice, based on her own experiences raising children. Primarily aimed at women, the columns engaged with advice on how to efficiently run the household and raise happy children. Additionally, Smith wrote advice for others on how to have their own writings published, providing them with her insight into the types of stories publishers select for their magazines and newspapers.

In addition to her columns, Smith's poetry was appreciated by the public. In 1891, Journalist Fannie L. Fancher described Smith's skill of verse: Smith "often casts one upon the literary wave which vibrates its chords of harmony around the earth." Smith commonly wrote about the flora and fauna of the Upper Midwest, furthering her contribution to regionalism. She took a particular interest to the White Clover, from which she got her pen name, Kit Clover, and of which she wrote her poetry book, The Rivulet and Clover Blooms, about.

=== Literary theory ===
Much of Smith's nonfiction work engaged with First Wave Feminist theory, with an emphasis on equal rights for women in the workforce. Born in the same year as the Seneca Falls Convention, Smith's political environment contributed to her career and writings. Her submission to a writer's magazine, a short essay entitled "Editor or Editress", questioned the divide of job titles based on gender. She believed that a woman's work writing or editing should be regarded as of the same caliber as a man's. Doctoral Candidate Carley Robertson described the essay as "outright addressing the issue" of women's titles in the workforce.

Smith's writings often reflected on the post-Civil War beliefs held by former members of the Confederacy. She detested slavery, writing that it's "evil influence" shaped both the American South and North into a permanently prejudiced society. In an essay entitled "The So-Called "Race Problem", Smith argues against the public opinion that Black Americans were the cause of America's problems (in regards to crime, job availability, and the economy).

== Works ==
=== Novels ===
- The Parson's Sin: A Novel (Alternate Title – Temptation) (1892)
- Winsome but Wicked (1892)
- St. Julian's Daughter: or, Was it Chance or Destiny? (1883)
- A cunning culprit; or, a "novel" novel: a composite romance by twenty different popular writers (1895)
- The Columbian Cook-Book
- Our Money-Makers

=== Short stories ===
- "Nina's Hero" (1884)
- "Waiting" (1862)
- "Hi Hapgood's Wife" (1898)
- "My Cousin Augusta" (1861)
- "A Woman's Portion" (1888)
- "A Curtain That Was Never Down"
- "Our Homemade Winter Garden"

=== Poetry book ===
- The Rivulet and Clover Blooms (1881)

=== Poems ===
- "To Susie" (1861)
- "Baby Jennie" (1861)
- "Eyes" (1861)
- "God is Love" (1861)
- "All's Well That Ends Well" (1861)
- "The Poor" (1898)
- "Favorite Primary Speaker" (1885)
- "Life and Song" (1908)
- "My Little Man"
- "At Set of Sun"
- "Where Corn is King"

=== Articles ===
- "Lead the Children" (The Catholic Columbian, 1887)
- "'Editor' or 'Editress'" (The Writer: A Monthly Magazine)
- "The So-Called Race Problem" (The Broad Ax, 1907)
- "Unite or Perish" (The Conservative, 1899)
- "Life's Cares.: Maud's Notions About Them" (Chicago Daily Tribune, 1880)
- "Bottled Souls.: A Strange Fancy" (The Chicago Daily Tribune, 1880)
- "The Popular Trend" (The Woman's Tribune)
- "The Gospel of Freedom" (The Woman's Journal)
- "The One Best Help" (The Western Garden and Poultry Journal)
- "The Key to the Mysteries" (The Temple ... a Monthly Magazine Devoted to the Fuller Unfoldment of the Divinity of Humanity, 1898)
- "Marketable Literary Goods" (The Writer; a Monthly Magazine for Literary Workers, 1888)
