= John Rosemond =

American writer

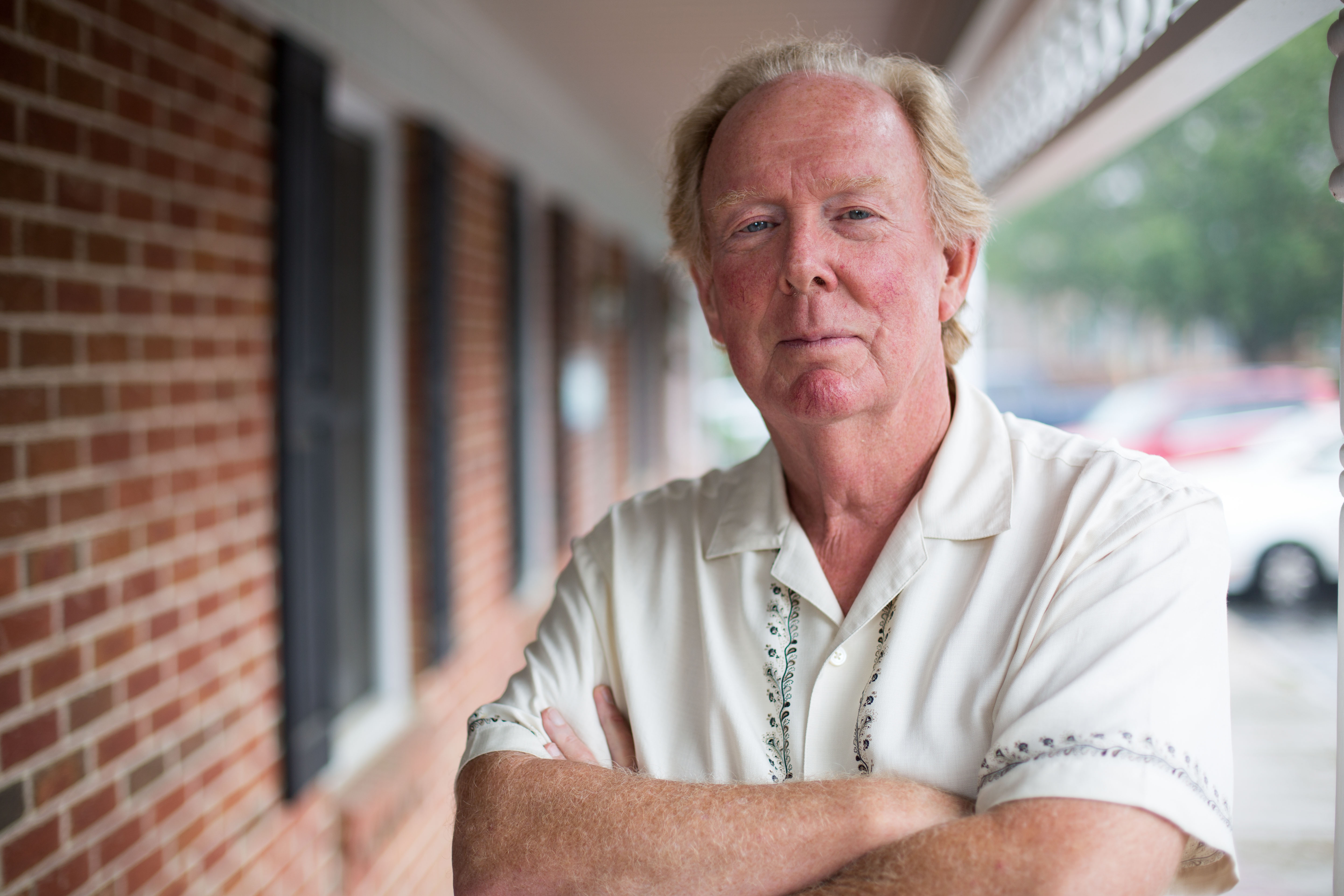
- Born: John Kirk Rosemond; November 25, 1947 (age 78); Asheville, NC, U.S.
- Education: Western Illinois University
- Occupations: Author; Newspaper Columnist; Public Speaker; Radio; Psychological Associate; Broadcaster
- Spouse: Wilma Rosemond (m. 1968)
- Children: 2
- Website: www.parentguru.com

John Rosemond (born November 25, 1947) is an American columnist, public speaker and author on parenting, with 15 books on the subject. His ideas revolve around authority for parents and discipline for children. He sometimes collaborates with PragerU as researcher and spokesperson.

== Personal life and education ==
Rosemond grew up in South Carolina until age 7 when he moved with his family to Chicago. He earned his master's degree in psychology at Western Illinois University.

At age 20, he married Willie Herman. They had two children.

== Criticism ==
In 1992, Rosemond wrote a column in which he stated that an 18-month-old girl who had been sexually abused on one occasion by a non-family member (babysitter) was unlikely to ever remember the event; therefore, therapy was not called for. Rosemond's advice was in line with research into human memory which finds that regardless of the nature of an event, permanent memory does not form until around age 36 months, on average. However, it directly contradicts years of research indicating that preverbal trauma has lifelong psychological and neurodevelopmental effects, especially if untreated.

In 2013, the Kentucky Psychology Board initiated a letter to Rosemond from the Attorney General of Kentucky, charging Rosemond with practicing psychology in Kentucky without a license issued by them. The charge was based solely on the fact that Rosemond's syndicated column appears in five Kentucky newspapers. Rosemond sued the Kentucky Psychology Board and Attorney General in federal court, charging them with attempting to suppress his First Amendment rights. He subsequently released the Attorney General from the suit. The Psychology Board refused to back down and the case went to court. Rosemond won in October 2015.

== Books ==
Rosemond has authored or co-authored fifteen books, including:

Books as sole author:

- Rosemond, John K. (1981). Parent Power!. Fast & Macmillan Publishers. ISBN 0-914788-42-6.
- Rosemond, John (2001). John Rosemond's New Parent Power! (First ed.). Andrews McMeel Publishing. ISBN 978-0740714153.
- Rosemond, John (2006). The New Six-Point Plan for Raising Happy, Healthy Children. Andrews McMeel Publishing. ISBN 978-0740760778.
- Rosemond, John (1995). A Family of Value. Andrews McMeel Publishing. ISBN 978-0836205053.
- Rosemond, John (2000). Raising a Nonviolent Child. Andrews McMeel Publishing. ISBN 0-7407-0671-3.
- Rosemond, John (2001). Teen-Proofing: Fostering Responsible Decision Making in Your Teenager. Andrews McMeel Publishing. ISBN 978-0740710216.
- Rosemond, John (2005). Family Building: The Five Fundamentals of Effective Parenting. Andrews McMeel Publishing. ISBN 0-7407-5569-2.
- Rosemond, John (2012). Parent-Babble: How Parents Can Recover from Fifty Years of Bad Expert Advice. Andrews McMeel Publishing. ISBN 978-1449422332.
- Rosemond, John (2009). The Well-Behaved Child: Discipline That Really Works!. Thomas Nelson. ISBN 978-0-7852-2904-9.
- Rosemond, John (2012). Toilet Training Without Tantrums. Andrews McMeel Publishing. ISBN 978-1449418489.
- Rosemond, John (2013). Parenting by The Book : Biblical Wisdom for Raising Your Child. Howard Books. ISBN 978-1476718712.
- Rosemond, John (2013). Making the "Terrible" Twos Terrific!. Andrews McMeel Publishing. ISBN 978-1449421601.
- Rosemond, John (2014). John Rosemond's Fail-Safe Formula for Helping Your Child Succeed in School. Andrews McMeel Publishing. ISBN 978-1449422301.
- Rosemond, John (2015). Grandma Was Right after All!: Practical Parenting Wisdom from the Good Old Days. Tyndale House. ISBN 978-1496405913.

Books with others:

- Rosemond, John; Ravenel, Bose (2009). The Diseasing of America's Children: Exposing the ADHD Fiasco and Empowering Parents to Take Back Control. Thomas Nelson. ISBN 978-0785297475.
