= Victor Mills =

American chemical engineer (1897–1997)

- Born: March 28, 1897; Milford, Nebraska
- Died: November 1, 1997 (aged 100); Tucson, Arizona
- Known for: Creating the modern disposable diaper and the production concept for Pringles.
- Spouse: Grace Riggs Mills

Victor Mills (March 28, 1897 – November 1, 1997) was an American chemical engineer for the Procter & Gamble company. He is most credited for the creation of modern disposable diapers and the Pampers brand, production improvements for Ivory soap and Duncan Hines cake mix, and the production concept for Pringles. Within P&G he is regarded as the most productive technologist in the company's history. Therefore, when the company formed an honorary society for their engineers, it was named the Victor Mills Society.

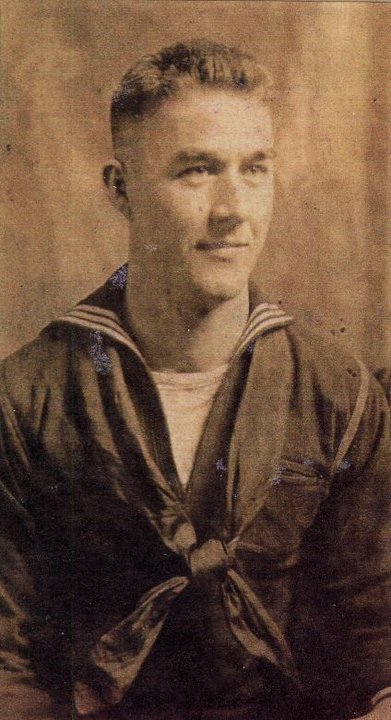
Victor Mills in the Navy

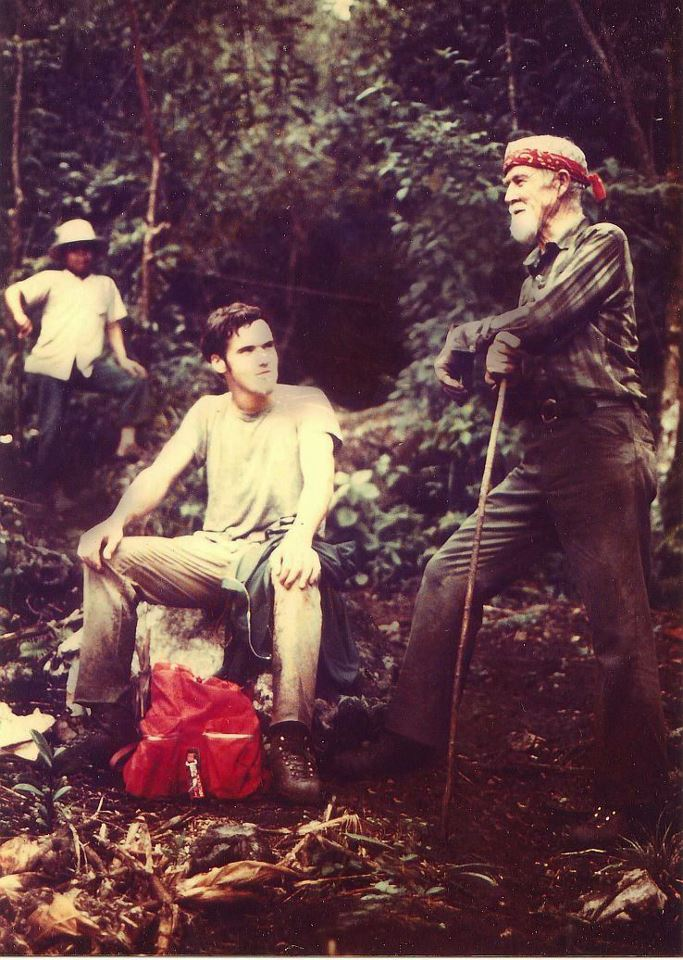
Victor Mills, trekking with his grandson in Guatemala, 1973

Mills was born in Milford, Nebraska, to a family of farmers, preachers and mule-team drivers. He served in the United States Navy during World War I, aboard the battleship Missouri. He worked his way up from the black gang to being a welder. At the end of the war he took discharge at Honolulu, Hawaii and lived as a beachcomber and welder on the island of Molokai. There he met his future wife, Grace Riggs, a missionary from Eddyville, Iowa; she insisted that he return to the mainland and get an education. He graduated from the University of Washington in 1926 with a degree in chemical engineering.

He was hired by Procter & Gamble right out of college and moved to the Cincinnati, Ohio, headquarters of the company. His first major innovation was converting soap production from a batch process—basically cooking in large cauldrons—to a continuous stream operation, which cut production time for Ivory soap from seven days to just a few hours. During the 1930s he built a large home on Hilltop Lane in the Cincinnati suburb of Wyoming, Ohio, where he and Grace raised their only child, daughter Maile. He then applied ideas from soap chemistry to improve the production of cake mixes and peanut butter, among other products. During World War II he was involved with the production of synthetic rubber with Waldo Semon, the inventor of vinyl, who was his mentor at the University of Washington in the early 1920s.

After the war, Mills headed up the Exploratory Development Department of P&G, responsible for finding new lines of product for the company. In that capacity, he conceived and led the development of Pampers during the 1950s. It was the world's first widely marketed disposable diaper, and currently P&G's largest brand by sales revenue. His last project was to oversee the development of Pringles. This potato snack is made using a slurry of potatoes, flour and flavorings which is pressed and dried into its distinctive shape: the process owes a lot to Mills' earlier work producing soap flakes.

He retired to Tucson, Arizona, in 1961 and spent his time on his hobbies. He had an extensive garden of cacti and other plants of his adopted Sonoran Desert region. He traveled the world, both on cruise ships with his wife, and on hiking expeditions. At one point, he was the oldest man on record to have climbed Mount Rainier, and likewise Point Lenana on Mount Kenya. He died at his home in 1997, at the age of 100.
