= Genie Z. Laborde =

Genie Zylks Laborde (February 19, 1928 – January 14, 2023) was an American author, educator, video producer, and artist. She was the founder and CEO of International Dialogue Education Associates, Inc., a business seminar company based in Palo Alto, California. Laborde authored several business communication and negotiation books and designed the three-day business seminar “Influencing with Integrity”.

== Biography ==
Laborde’s doctoral degree was from the University of California at Santa Barbara. Her major discipline was Confluent Education, which is Gestalt psychology applied to the educational process. The Confluent Education program was founded by a Ford Foundation Grant for Innovative Education. Laborde’s Master of Arts degree in Creative Writing was conferred by Tulane University, and her Bachelor of Arts in Design and Fine Art was earned at Louisiana State University.

Ladorde died on January 14, 2023, at the age of 94.

== Influences ==
Interested by the new esoteric classes offered at the Esalen Institute in Big Sur, California which formed a key part of the Human Potential Movement of the 1960s, during the 1970s she studied with many of the leaders of this movement including George Leonard, Alan Watts, George I. Brown, Gay Luce, Frank Barron, Buckminster Fuller, Joseph Campbell, Joseph Downing, Barbara Brennan, and received Arica Training.

== Career ==
In 1984, Laborde published the communication and negotiation book Influencing with Integrity: Management Skills for Communication and Negotiation, which sold over 151,000 copies and was translated into several languages. The book’s instructional content supports her three-day Influencing with Integrity seminar. The skills taught in the seminar are drawn from Gestalt psychology, linguistics, and right brain insights. While some of the skills overlap with those of neuro-linguistic programming, Laborde emphasizes the psychological principles of Fritz Perls as well as the concrete and theoretical differences between integrity and manipulation in business communication and actions.

In 1991, Laborde traveled to Russia on invitation from the Russian Psychological Association to teach seminars which included research demonstrating a statistically important movement towards increased personal responsibility as shown by the pre- and post-test figures. Her communication and negotiation seminars have been taught at the United Nations as well as worldwide. Laborde has produced video training films and courses on her influencing and communication techniques. In 2011 her company International Dialogue Education Associates, Inc. released its first iPhone application “Circle of Excellence”.

During the course of her career, Laborde has been a member of the American Psychological Association, the Association for Humanistic Psychology, and the American Society for Training and Development (ASTD). Laborde has given numerous presentations to the ASTD and was invited to be the keynote speaker for the annual Conference of the ASTD Global Network South Africa in Johannesburg. She has been a visiting scholar at the Western Michigan University. The Mercury News featured her as the "Grandmother of Silicon Valley" in regards to her Palo Alto real estate where a number of tech giants including Nest got their start.

== Publications ==
- Influencing with Integrity: Management Skills for Communication and Negotiation (1984)
- Fine Tune Your Brain: When Everything's Going Right and What to Do When It Isn't (1989)
- Using Your Right Brain For a Change
- Influencing with Integrity on the Internet (2000)
- 103 Ways to Tap Your Right Brain
- Spellbinding: Skills for Relationships (2008)
- Recreating A Relationship with a New Paradigm: A New Set of Beliefs and Experiences that Work Better than the Old
- Quick Skills For Relationships; Expert Communication = Success in Your Relationship
- Adult Coloring Book; The Ten Universal Laws of Charismatic Relationships
- Influencing with Integrity By The Numbers
- Instant Charisma By Using Your Right Brain
- Selling with Integrity; The Skills of Influencing with Integrity Applied to Sales
- Rapport on the Telephone
- Child Development Techniques
- Tooting Your Own Horn: How To Measure Soft-Skills Training
- You CAN Measure the Results of Soft-Skills Training. It's Been Done. Here's How!
- The ABCs of Negotiation; The Skills of Influencing with Integrity Applied to Negotiation
- Infinite Energy Not Luck; Finding FLOW for Empowerment
- 90 Days to Communication Excellence (1985)
- The ABCs of NLP

== Sources ==
- "'Watch the Lower Lip!' - Using Facial Expressions to Detect Fraud". Bankinfosecurity.com. 2010-04-19.
- "International Association of Teamwork Facilitators: Influencing with Integrity - an interview with Genie Laborde". Teachmeteamwork.com. 2005-05-12.
- "Inspirational meetings!". Teachingexpertise.com. 2009-04-19. Archived from the original on 2012-06-14.
- "Creating Rapport" (PDF). NHS Wales.
- Rick Sloboda (@webcopyplus) (2008-07-29). "How Internet Users Prefer and Process Information". Cmswire.com.
- "The WIP Contributors : Genie Z. Laborde". Thewip.net. 1999-02-22. Archived from the original on 2012-01-01.
- "Job Search Fear Gone In 60 Seconds". Articlesnatch.com.
- "Communication Strategy and Design". Sinclair Loeffler. Archived from the original on 2012-03-02.
- Executive Strategies. "Influencing with Integrity Class | Savannah Georgia Private Investigation Services". Execstrat.com. Archived from the original on 2011-12-04.
- "Grandmother of Silicon Valley"
