= Geni =

Geni or GENI may refer to:

- Geni.com, a genealogy-related web service
- Geni (footballer) (b. 1980), Spanish football (soccer) player, full name Eugenio Suárez Santos
- Global Environment for Network Innovations, a planned National Science Foundation facilities project
- Geni, Siliguri, a census town in Darjeeling district, West Bengal, India

== See also ==
- Genie (disambiguation)
