= Infant Potty Training =

Book by Laurie Boucke

Infant Potty Training: a Gentle and Primeval Method Adapted to Modern Living
- Author: Laurie Boucke
- Illustrator: Rusty Haller
- Cover artist: Colin White
- Genre: Parenting, Non-fiction
- Publisher: White-Boucke Publishing
- Publication date: 2000, 2002, 2008
- Publication place: USA
- Media type: Trade paperback
- Pages: 330
- ISBN: 978-1-888580-30-3
- Dewey Decimal: 649/.62 22
- LC Class: HQ770.5 .B68 2008

Infant Potty Training: A Gentle and Primeval Method Adapted to Modern Living is a book about toilet training by Laurie Boucke. It is an expansion of ideas that were originally presented in a small self-published volume called Trickle Treat in 1991. Infant Potty Training was first published in 2000, is now in its third edition (2008), and has editions in German, Dutch, Italian and Japanese. Infant potty training is traditionally used in at least 80 countries.

Boucke's method of infant potty training is based on an ancient means of toilet training stemming from cultures that don't use diapers and washing machines, and that has been adapted to a modern urban lifestyle in various ways, including the use of a potty or toilet, part-time pottying and part-time diapering. Instead of always letting a baby eliminate in a diaper, parents start to offer some potty or toilet visits, usually at a much earlier age than with contemporary toilet training.

== Overview of the book ==
The book consists of four parts:

- Part I is a how-to guide that also includes chapters on current medical research on infant potty training, historical writings, environmental considerations, and diapers.
- Part II gives detailed testimonials by experienced parents in the United States.
- Part III consists of testimonials from 13 other countries.
- Part IV covers cross-cultural studies in the form of anthropological reports from many different societies and cultures in Asia, Africa, the Arctic Regions and the Americas.

== Synopsis of the practice ==
The key is to create cue associations that can be used as a means of communication. This is done by learning and responding to body language and vocalizations, as well as to elimination timing and patterns. As a child matures, he starts to intentionally signal about his toilet needs. As with other means of toilet training, there is no fixed length or guaranteed outcome. The four main steps for beginners are:

- Observation/Familiarization

Parents watch and take note of the child's:

- Timing (Elimination frequency in relation to waking and feeding)
- Body language (Example: grimacing)
- Sounds (Example: grunting)

- Anticipation/Intuition

Parents anticipate when the child needs to go, then at that moment, give a cue signal (a sound, hand signal, word or phrase). The child will associate these with potty time.

- Position/Location

After establishing a comfortable position—whether it be in-arms for an infant or on a potty or toilet for a toddler — the same position and location are used for a while, and the child associates these with potty time.

- Reciprocal Communication

As the child matures, natural bodily and vocal communication expands to include intentional communication in various forms such as the use of sign language or other hand signals, vocalizations, words, and phrases. Parents continue to communicate through manual and audible signals.

== History ==
Variations of infant potty training have been used in non-Western societies for centuries, and this information has been passed down both orally and later in writing.

A hindrance to the acceptance of the practice in modern Western societies for some years was the misconception that infant potty training is the same as a somewhat harsh and coercive method used in the early 1900s in Europe and North America that used suppositories to put the baby on a strict schedule of bowel movements. This harsh toilet training method is described in the 1929 and 1935 editions of Infant Care, a US Department of Labor, Children's Bureau publication. However, gentler methods that did not rely on suppositories were recommended in the 1914 and 1938 and later editions of Infant Care. Though a regulated schedule was valued in many parts of infant care including toilet training, at no time was punishment considered appropriate for an infant under one year of age. Boucke's method of infant potty training focuses on learning and responding to the child’s natural elimination timing and signals rather than trying to institute a strict schedule.

== See also ==
- Attachment parenting
- Dunstan Baby Language
- Elimination communication
- Open-crotch pants
- Toilet training
