= Elimination communication =

Strategy used by caregivers of infants

Elimination communication (EC) is a practice in which a caregiver uses timing, signals, cues, and intuition to address an infant's need to eliminate waste. Caregivers try to recognize and respond to babies' bodily needs and enable them to urinate and defecate in an appropriate place (e.g. a toilet). Caregivers may use diapers (nappies) as a back-up in case of "misses" some or all of the time, or not at all. EC emphasizes communication between the caregiver and child, helping them both become more attuned to the child's innate rhythms and control of urination and defecation. The term "elimination communication" was inspired by traditional practices of diaperless baby care in less industrialized countries and hunter-gatherer cultures. Some practitioners of EC begin soon after birth, the optimum window being zero to four months in terms of helping the baby get in tune with their elimination needs, although it can be started with babies of any age. The practice can be done full-time, part-time, or just occasionally.

In the UK, baby-led potty training is a similar system for meeting babies' toileting needs. The main feature of the system is that care-givers 'hold babies out' or support them on a potty in order for them to void in an appropriate place outside their nappy. The method is typically started before the baby is six months old. Care-givers use a combination of timing, and observing babies' own signals, to decide when to hold them out. Some parents use the technique just occasionally, others as an alternative to full-time nappies, and some as a route to toilet independence.

== Origins ==
The terms elimination communication and natural infant hygiene were coined by Ingrid Bauer and are used interchangeably in her book, Diaper Free! The Gentle Wisdom of Natural Infant Hygiene (2001). Bauer had traveled to India and Africa, where she noticed that while most mothers carried their diaperless babies constantly, she saw no elimination "accidents" as would be expected in industrialized countries where babies wear diapers almost continuously from birth. Subsequently, she raised her own children with minimal use of diapers, and eventually began to share her approach with other mothers and caregivers—initially through Internet-based parenting support groups and eventually through her book and website.

Prior publications introducing Western parents to this practice include the booklet Conscious Toilet Training, by Laurie Boucke (1979), the book Trickle Treat: Diaperless Infant Toilet Training Method, by Laurie Boucke (1991), a pamphlet entitled Elimination Timing, by Natec (1994), and the more extensive Infant Potty Training: A Gentle and Primeval Method Adapted to Modern Living, by Laurie Boucke (2000). Boucke was influenced by an Indian friend who taught her how mothers in India care for babies without diapers, and she adapted the method to fit her Western lifestyle. Boucke later co-produced an in-depth DVD entitled Potty Whispering: The Gentle Practice of Infant Potty Training (2006) and co-authored articles for medical journals.

While the terms elimination communication and infant potty training have become synonymous, many caregivers who practice EC do not consider it to be a form of "training", per se. "Nappyless technique" is a term some mothers in the UK prefer to describe babies who use a potty. EC is viewed primarily as a way to meet the baby's present needs and to enhance attachment and communication in general. In that sense, EC is often likened to breastfeeding. "Toilet mastery is, of course, an inevitable consequence", writes Bauer, "Yet it's no more the goal of Natural Infant Hygiene than weaning is the goal of breastfeeding" (2001, p. 217).

Today, one often hears the terms "natural infant hygiene", "infant potty training", "nappy-free", "infant pottying" and "elimination communication" used synonymously.

The method of holding a baby out to trigger the reflex to urinate and defecate has presumably been used by mothers since the first Homo sapiens. The English doctor Pye Henry Chavasse suggested in his 1839 book "Advice to a Mother on the Management of her Children", that the baby should be held out over a pot at least a dozen times a day at 3 months old; if this were done, there need be no more nappies at 4 months. In 1912 Edward Mansfield Brockbank advised that babies should be supported on the pot from two months old. The practise was commonplace up until the fifties, when Dr Spock's method of delaying the start of toilet training until 18 months became popular. This, coupled with the advent of disposable nappies meant that the practise of BLPT diminished. Although some mothers still used the method, learning about it either by accident or intuition, or from knowledge passed on by grandparents, the method dropped out of common usage. From the nineties until the present, official UK health advice suggests that it is counter-productive to start toilet training before 18 months, and the standard advice is to wait until children showed signs of "readiness" (but not before 18 – 24 months of age). Amongst some health professionals there is a received wisdom that babies have no bladder or bowel control under two years.

== Benefits ==
According to The Diaper-Free Baby by Christine Gross-Loh, EC offers a wide range of advantages. Because EC lessens families' reliance on diapers, this helps reduce the environmental impact of discarding disposable diapers and/or washing cloth diapers, and saves families hundreds, if not thousands, of dollars in disposable diapers. EC babies are free from the problems of conventional diapering such as diaper rash, diaper change battles, not being able to explore diapered parts of their bodies, vulnerability to urinary tract infections, and potentially delayed or difficult potty training. Gross-Loh also reports that EC promotes a unique and wonderful bond between babies and caregivers.

== Criticisms ==
Conventional potty training advice is based on late 1990s research by Thomas Berry Brazelton, who introduced the "readiness approach". He writes that "widespread acceptance of readiness and independent toileting have since been supported by clinical experience and resulted in agreement that a child should be ready to participate in toilet training at approximately 18 months of age and be trained completely by 2 or 3 years old." He argues that trying to toilet train before this age could be coercive and therefore psychologically damaging. Brazelton acknowledges that elimination communication is both possible and desirable, but he believes it is difficult to perform in Western society. In particular he cites a mother's return to work as an obstacle to elimination communication. He also argues that parents should not be made to feel guilty if they cannot communicate with their babies in this way. His neutrality on the subject has been questioned since he has worked as a consultant for Procter & Gamble, manufacturer of Pampers diapers, including appearing in a Pampers commercial.

== Components ==
The main components of EC are timing, signals, cueing, and intuition.

=== Timing ===
Timing refers to identifying the infant's natural timing of elimination. Newborns tend to urinate every 10–20 minutes, sometimes very regularly, which makes timing extremely useful. Older babies may still be very regular, or may vary in timing based on when they have last eaten or slept. As infants get older, the time between eliminations will increase. By six months, it is not uncommon for babies to go an hour or more without urinating while awake (babies, like adults, rarely urinate during a deep sleep). Timing varies radically for defecation, as some infants may have several bowel movements a day, while others may only have one every few days. Parents report that some babies as young as three months will appear to hold all their bowel movements until they are held in a particular squat position, as long as this is offered regularly enough. Parents also offer the potty at various times according to routine, e.g. after a feed, after waking, just before bath or bed. In the West, infant potty training historically relied on timing as the main method of training.

=== Signals ===
Signals are the baby's way of informing a caregiver of an elimination need. Some babies signal very clearly from the beginning, while others may have very subtle signals, or no signal at all. These signals vary widely from one infant to another. Examples include a certain facial expression, a particular cry, squirming, or a sudden unexplained fussiness, among others. Signals are most effectively observed if the baby is left without diapers for the first couple of weeks of starting elimination communication. Babies who are nursing will often start unlatching and relatching repeatedly as they feed when they need to eliminate. For defecation, many babies may grunt or pass gas as a signal. As babies get older their signals become more conscious and babies often point to, or look at, a caregiver or potty to indicate need. Older babies can learn a gesture or baby sign for "potty". Later they may learn a word as part of their early acquisition of language.

=== Cueing ===
Cueing consists of the caregiver making a particular sound or other cue when they provide the baby with an opportunity to eliminate. At first, the caregiver can make the cueing sound when the baby is eliminating to develop an association between the sound and the action. Once the association is established, the cue can be used to indicate to the baby that he or she is in an appropriate potty place. This is especially useful for infants who may not recognize public toilets or unfamiliar receptacles as a "potty". Common sound cues include "psss psss" for urination and "hmm hmm" (grunting) for defecation. Older babies (late starters) may respond better to more word-like cues. Cues do not have to be auditory; the act of sitting on the potty itself or being held in position can serve as a cue, or the sign language sign for "toilet" can be a cue. The American Sign Language sign for "toilet" involves forming a hand into the letter "T" (a fist with the thumb inserted between the first and middle fingers) and shaking the hand side to side from the wrist.

=== Intuition ===
Intuition refers to a caregiver's unprompted thought that the baby may need to eliminate. Although much intuition may simply be subconscious awareness of timing or signals, many parents who practice EC find it an extremely reliable component.

== Baby-led potty training method ==
Babies are born with a primitive reflex which causes them to empty their bladder when parents remove the diaper and hold them in a squat position. By holding their baby out regularly, parents capitalise on this reflex. They encourage the baby to go in this position, and soon the baby is conditioned to try to void when in this hold. Parents then offer the baby opportunities to go throughout the day. They can offer based on timing—either at convenient times for the parents, on a routine, or through learning what times the baby is likely to need to pass waste. They can also look out for signs that the baby is uncomfortable with a full bladder or bowel. Once the baby has become accustomed to passing waste when held or on the potty, parents are able to adapt the method to suit their lifestyle. They can offer the potty just occasionally to help relieve an unsettled baby, or they can offer regularly throughout the day in order to drastically reduce the reliance on nappies. When continued through to the baby's second year, the method is adapted to help them transition to complete toilet independence.

== See also ==
- Attachment parenting
- Dunstan Baby Language
- Infant potty training method
- Open-crotch pants
- Toilet training
