= DBL =

DBL may refer to:

- Dansk Biografisk Leksikon, a Danish biographical dictionary
- Dashing Buffalo, a professional League of Legends team based in Ho Chi Minh City, Vietnam
- dBase Language, the computer language implemented by dBASE Plus, dB2K, and Visual dBASE software
- Design-based learning, a modern pedagogy
- Devizes branch line, a defunct railway line running from Holt to Pewsey from 1857 to 1966
- Digital Bibliography & Library Project's DBL-Browser
- Don Bosco High & Technical School, Liluah, an all-boys, English medium school near the city of Kolkata, India
- Double (disambiguation), various meanings
- Double bottom line, an accounting framework that measures fiscal performance
- Drawing Black Lines, the second album by American Post-Hardcore band, Project 86
- Drexel Burnham Lambert, an investment bank
- Dunstan Baby Language, a theory about early baby language
- Dyirbal language, ISO 639-3 language code dbl
- Dragon Ball Legends, 2018 mobile game

== Sports ==
- DBL Arena
- Darwin Baseball League, Northern Territory, Australia
- Development Basketball League, a basketball league for middle and high school students in Indonesia
- Dominet Bank Ekstraliga, a former sponsored name of the Polish Basketball League
- Dutch Basketball League, the top professional basketball league in the Netherlands
- Deutsche Baseball Liga, the premier professional league of baseball in Germany

== See also ==
- Down by Law (disambiguation)
