= Close stool =

Early type of portable toilet

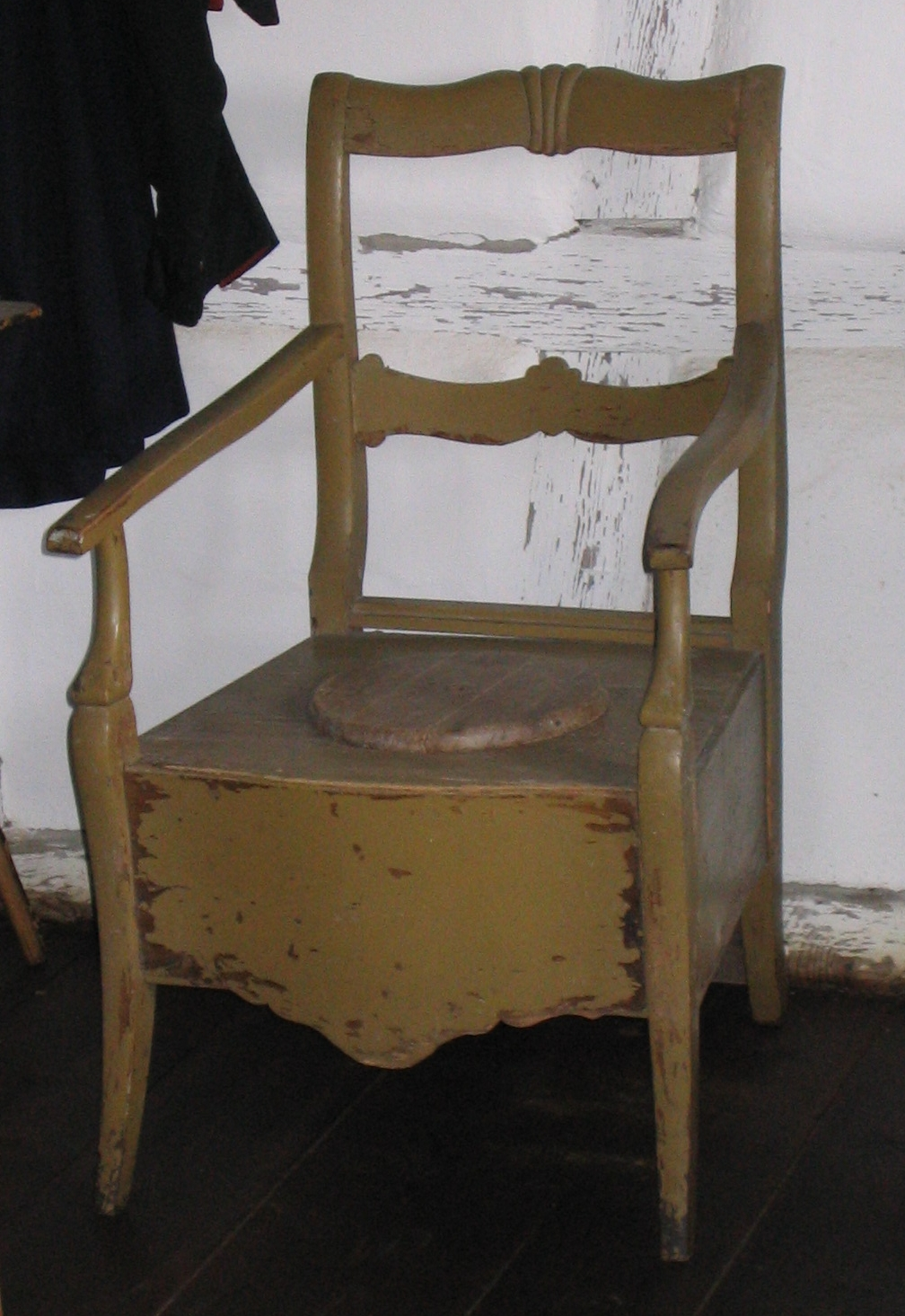
Toilet chair

A close stool was an early type of portable toilet, made in the shape of a cabinet or box at sitting height with an opening in the top. The external structure contained a pewter or earthenware chamberpot to receive the user's excrement and urine when they sat on it; this was normally covered (closed) by a folding lid. "Stool" has two relevant meanings: as a type of seat and as human feces. Close stools were used from the Middle Ages (the Oxford English Dictionary gives the first citation as 1410) until the introduction of the indoor flush toilet.

== At the Tudor Court ==
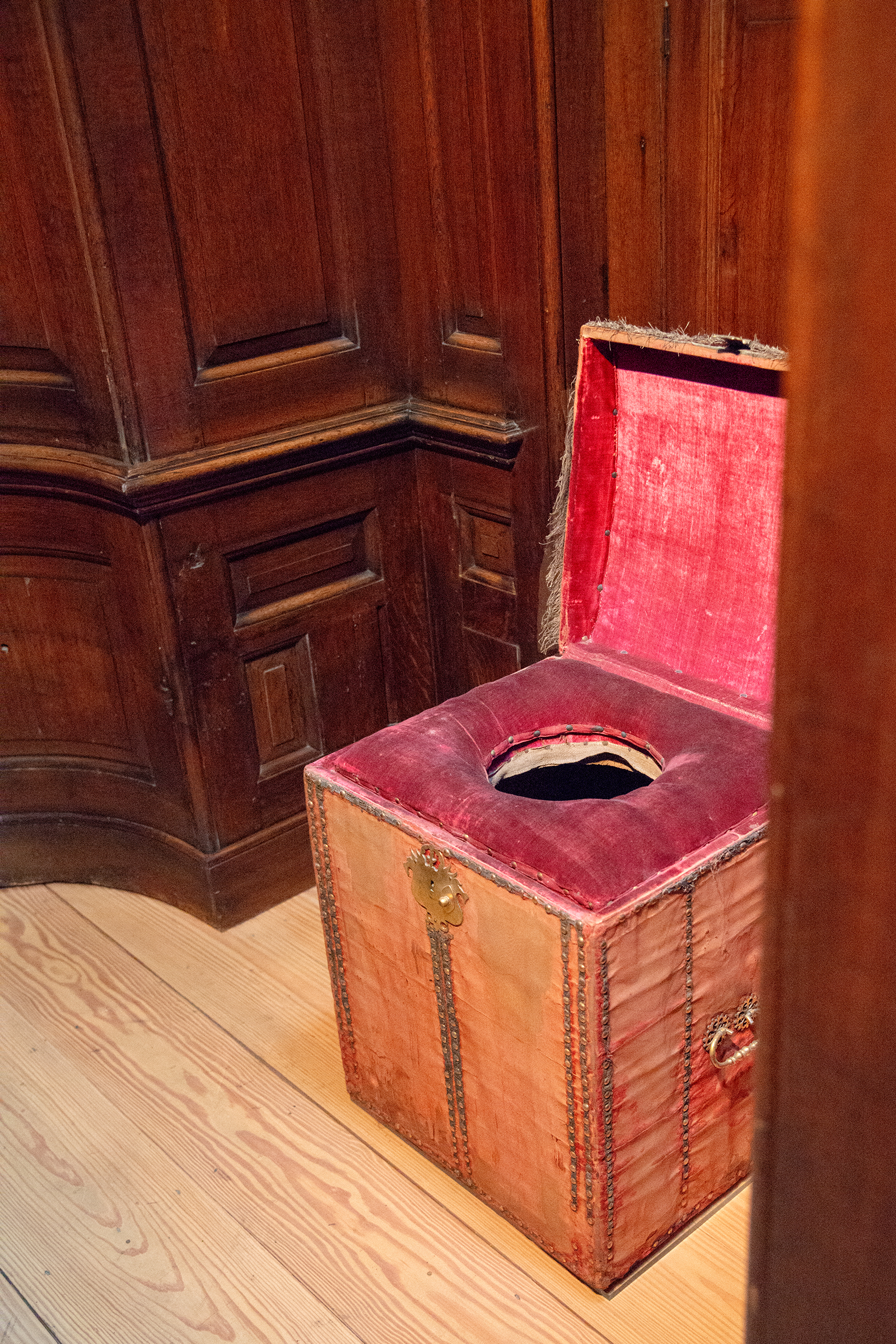
An uphostered close stool at Hampton Court Palace

Records of the English court mention the "close stool" and detail its construction. As an example, the furniture maker and upholsterer William Green made a "close stool" in August 1537 for the Lady Mary. The stool was upholstered with crimson velvet and a silkwoman, Mistress Margery Vaughan, provided crimson silk fringes and ribbons for its decoration. Green made a leather carrying case for the stool. Close stools belonging to Cardinal Wolsey were covered with scarlet cloth and black velvet. Lady Jane Grey ordered crimson velvet to cover two close stools in July 1553.

== Other names ==
In Scotland, equivalent close stools appear in inventories and were sometimes called "dry stools" or "stools of ease". James V of Scotland and his daughter Mary, Queen of Scots, both owned silk canopies which were suspended from the ceiling over the stool.

The close stool was sometimes called a necessary stool or a night stool. The eighteenth-century euphemism was convenience; the term was further euphemised in the nineteenth century with the term night commode, which John Gloag suggested may have derived its significance from a "balance night stool" described in Thomas Sheraton's Cabinet Dictionary (London, 1803). Sheraton's design was "made to have the appearance of a small commode standing upon legs; when it is used the seat part presses down to a proper height by the hand, and afterwards it rises by means of lead weights, hung to the seat, by lines passing over pulleys at each end, all which are enclosed in a case." This appears to be the link between "commode" as an elegant article of French furniture, and "commode" as a prosaic invalid toilet. One meaning of commode survived into the twentieth century to refer to the flush toilet; "toilet" was itself originally euphemistic.

The French term for this item of furniture is a chaise percée ("pierced chair"), as it often takes the form of a chair with a seat which raises to show the opening to the pot; similar items were made specifically as a moveable bidet.

The French secretary of Mary, Queen of Scots, Claude Nau, described her talking to the Countess of Huntly about their plans to escape from Holyroodhouse after the murder of David Rizzio, while she was sitting on her chaise percée.

== Developments ==
A nineteenth century development is the thunderbox.

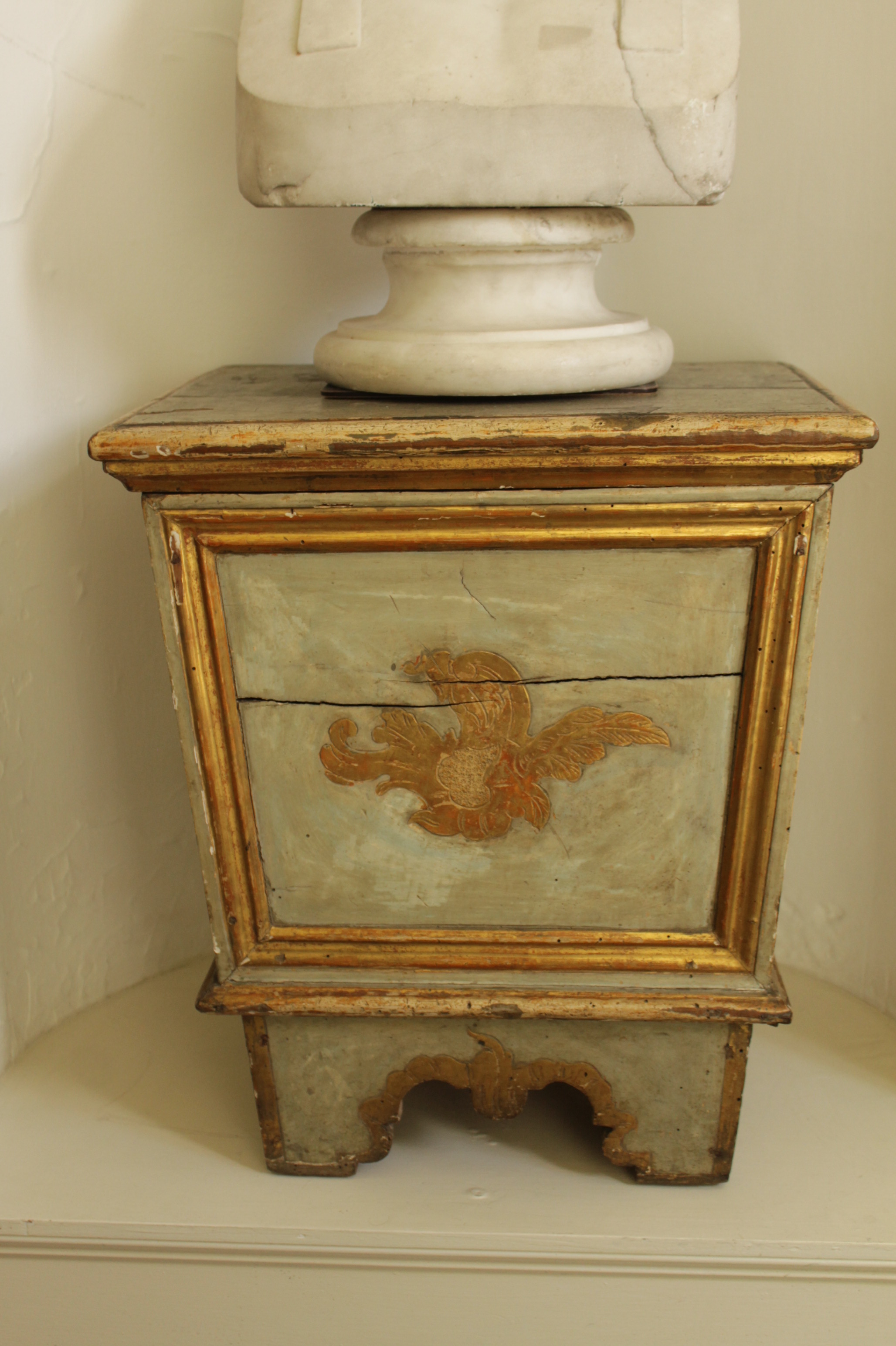
Italian thunderbox c. 1750

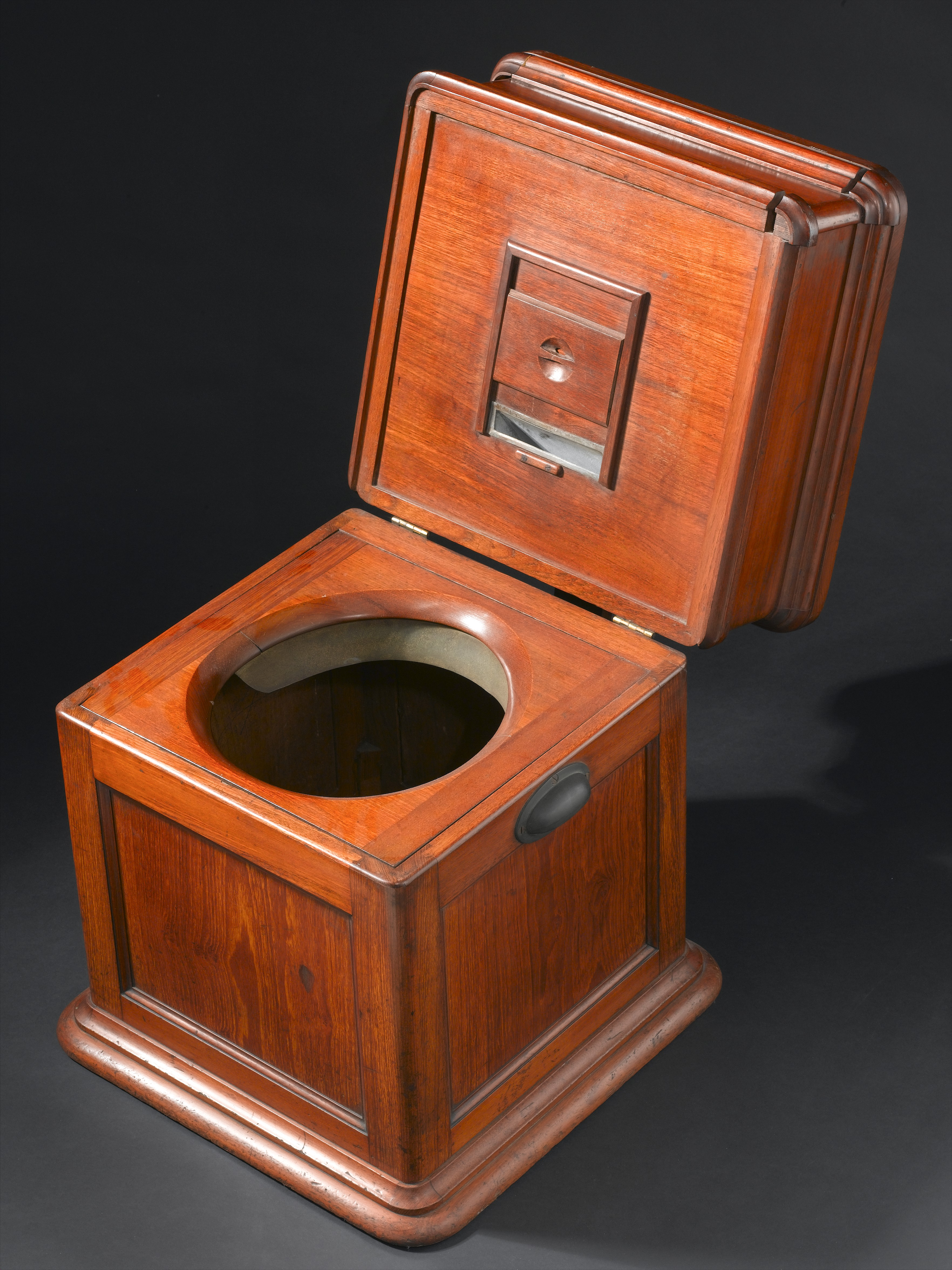
19th-century thunderbox

== Cultural significance ==
The Groom of the Stool was a high-ranking courtier who assisted the monarch with the close stool.

== See also ==
- Commode
- Potty chair
