= Potty chair =

Toilet for young children

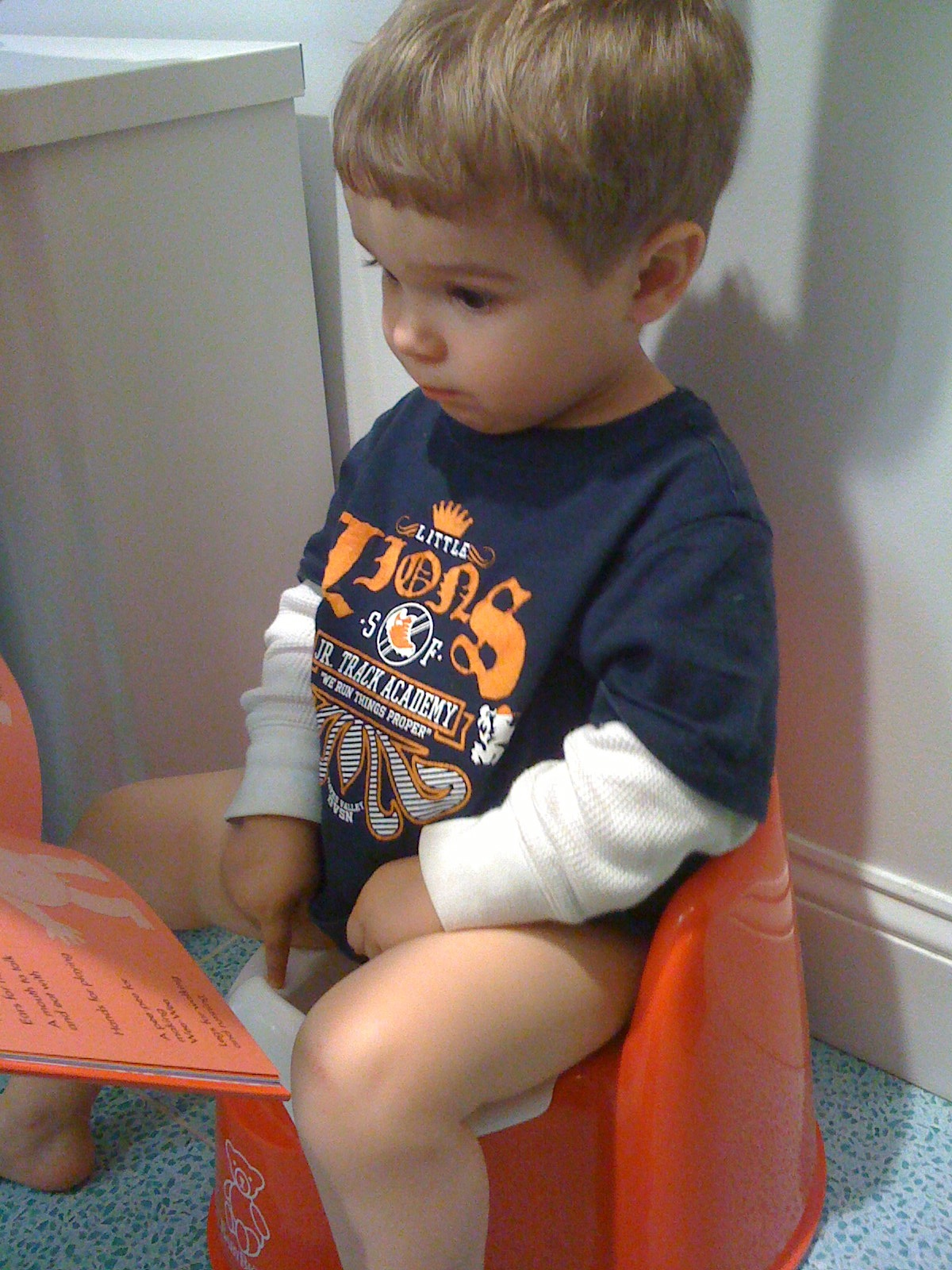
A young child sits on a potty chair.

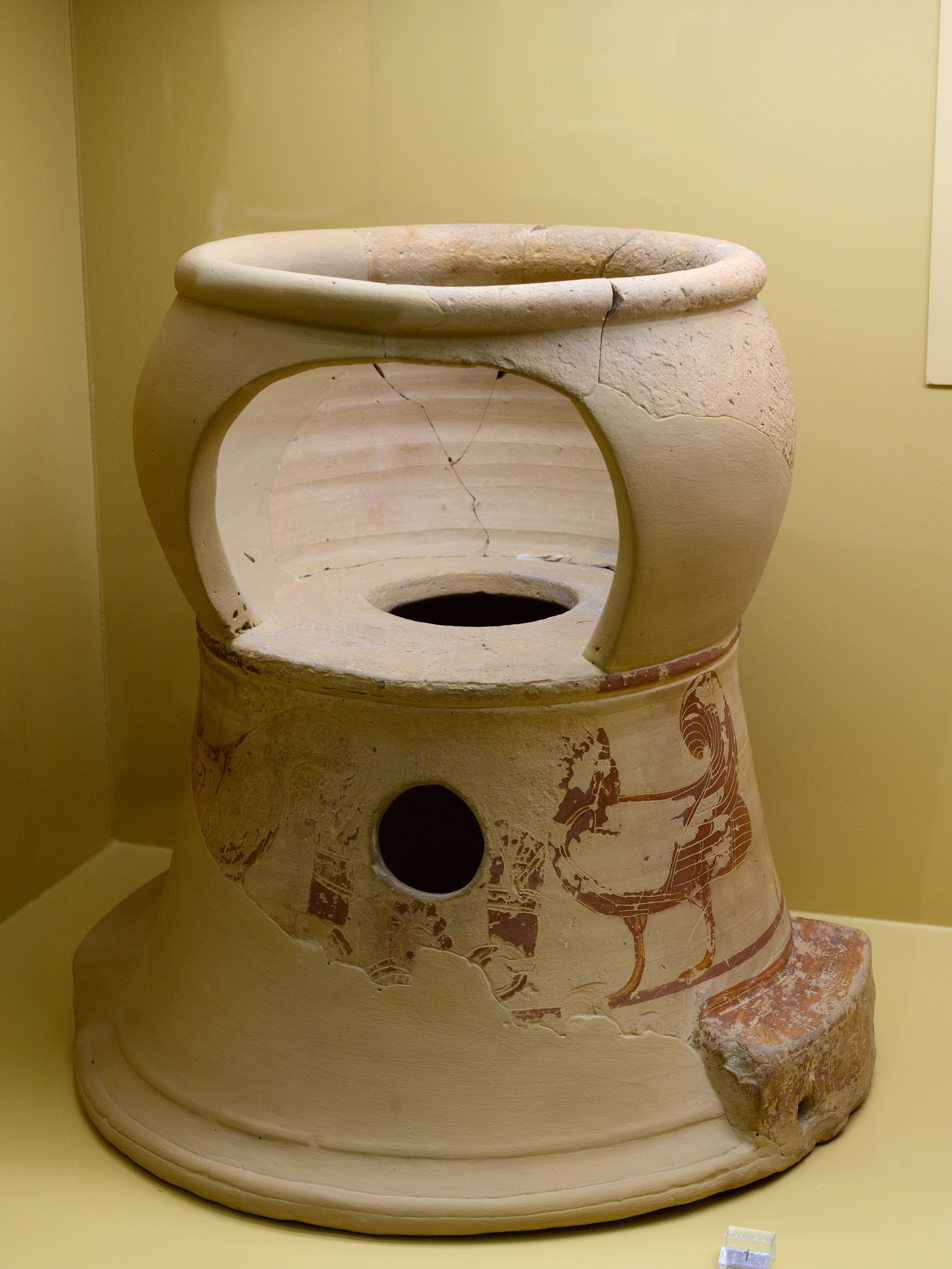
Ancient Greek potty chair.

A potty chair, or simply a potty, is a proportionately small chair or enclosure with an opening for seating very young children in order for them to urinate and defecate ("go potty"). Potty chairs are a variant of the close stool, which were commonly used by adults before the widespread adoption of water flush toilets. There are a variety of potty chair designs. One type of potty chair, placed directly over the toilet, is called a "toilet training seat" and allows ejected fecal material from a young child to drop directly into the toilet bowl, therefore eliminating manual removal and disposal of the said waste from a receptacle beneath the hole, which is often a bag or receptacle similar to a chamber pot. Potty chairs are typically used during the potty training, also known as toilet training, of toddlers.

Usage of potty chairs greatly varies across cultures.

Potty chairs have been used to toilet train toddlers as far back as sixth-century ancient Greece; a clay potty chair from that time period was once discovered in the Ancient Agora of Athens, and potty chair images can be seen in red figure pottery iconography.
