= Chamber pot =

Portable toilet

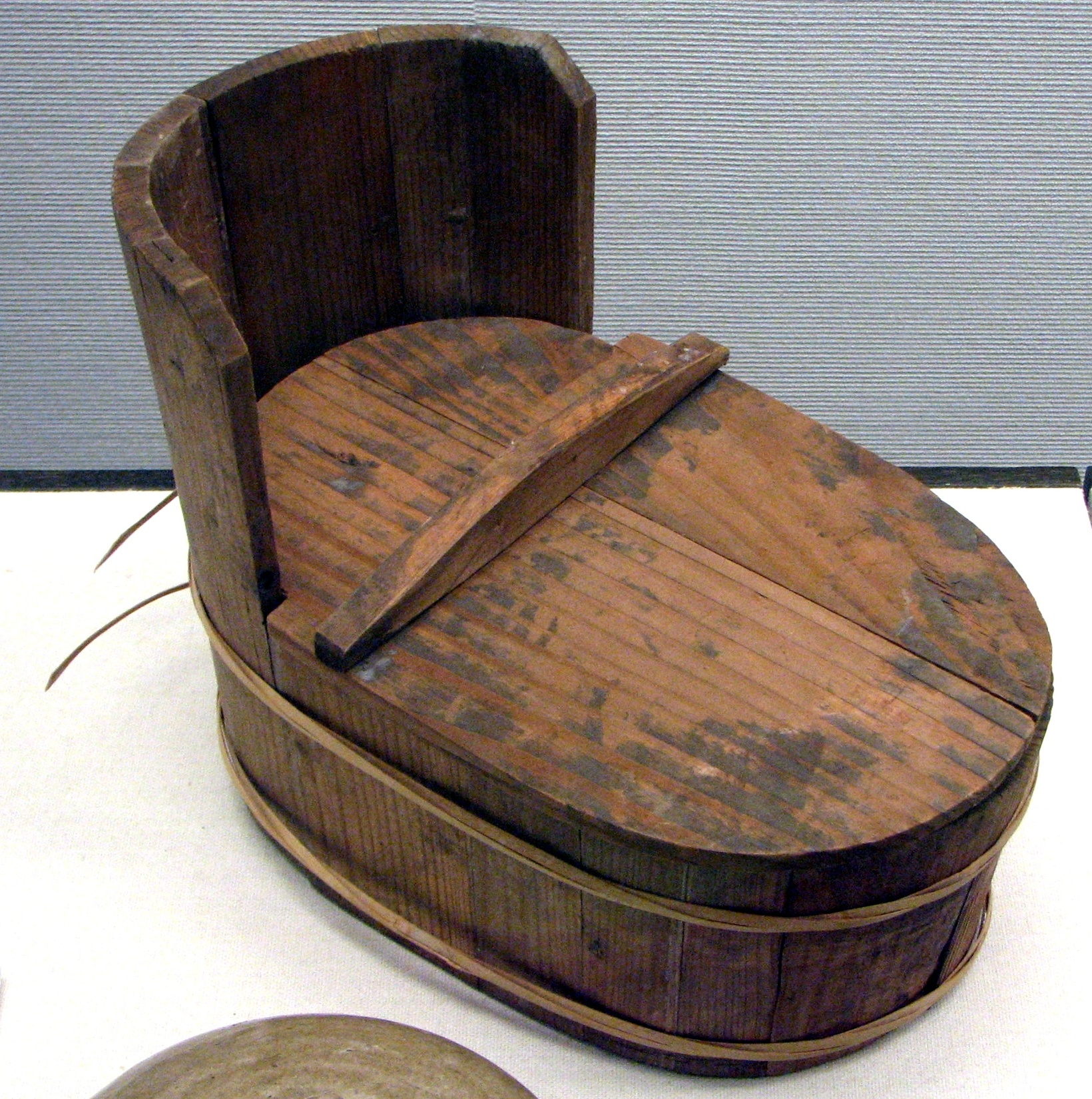
Japanese chamber pot from the Edo period

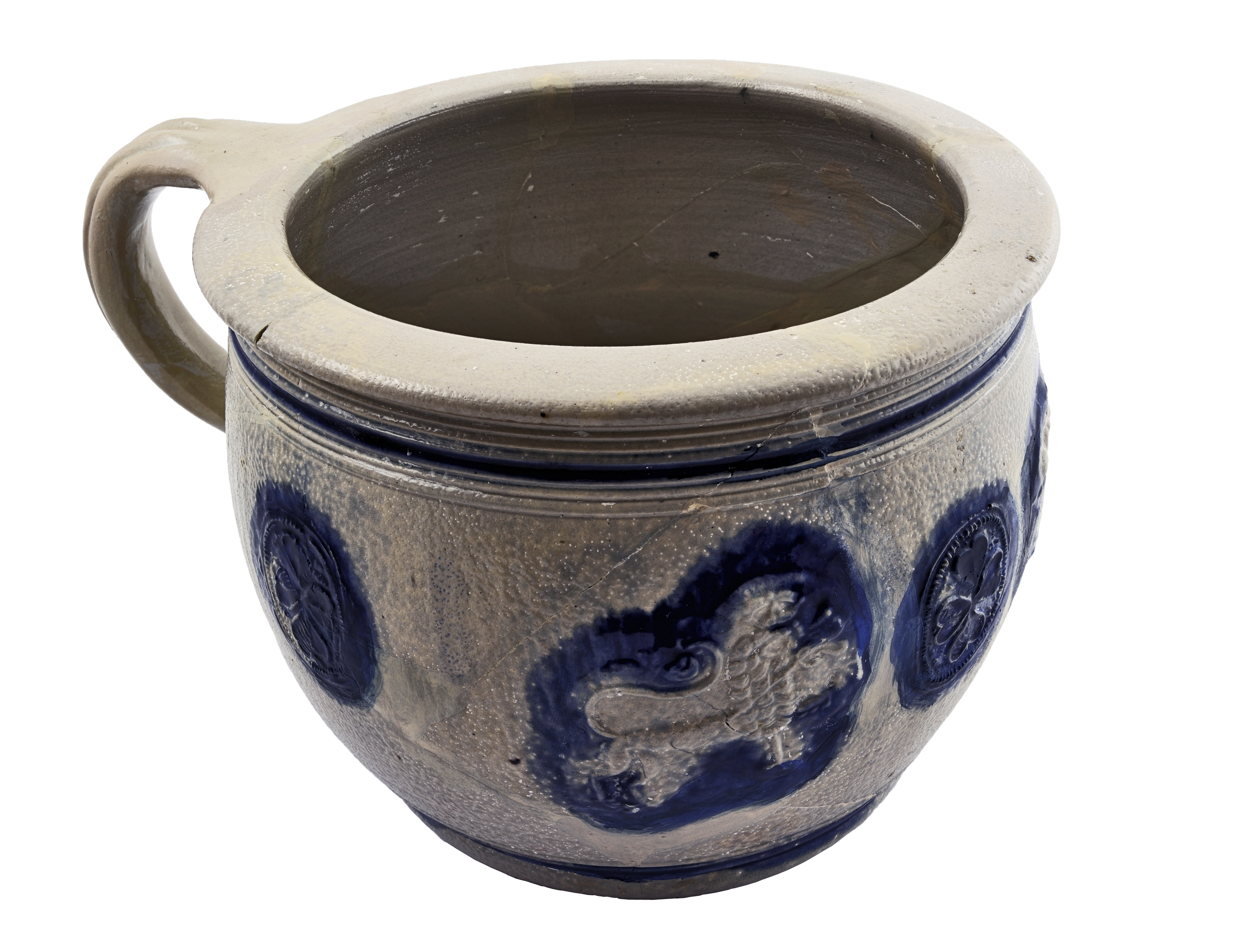
Chamber pot in Westerwald ceramics, early 18th century. Archeological find from Bruges.

A chamber pot is a portable toilet, meant for nocturnal use in the bedroom. It was common in many cultures before the advent of indoor plumbing and flushing toilets.

== Names and etymology ==
"Chamber" is an older term for bedroom. The chamber pot is also known as a Jordan, a jerry, a guzunder, a po (possibly from French: pot de chambre), a potty pot, a potty, a thunder pot, or a thunder mug. It was also known as a chamber utensil or bedroom ware.

== History ==
Chamber pots were used in ancient Greece at least since the 6th century BC and were known under different names: ἀμίς (amis), οὐράνη (ouranē) and οὐρητρίς (ourētris, from οὖρον - ouron, "urine"), σκωραμίς / (skōramis), χερνίβιον (chernibion).

The introduction of indoor flush toilets started to displace chamber pots in the 19th century, but they remained common until the mid-20th century. The alternative to using the chamber pot was a trip to the outhouse.

In China, the chamber pot (便壶 (biàn hú) was common. A wealthy salt merchant in the city of Yangzhou became the symbol of conspicuous excess when he commissioned a chamber pot made of gold which was so tall that he had to climb a ladder to use it.

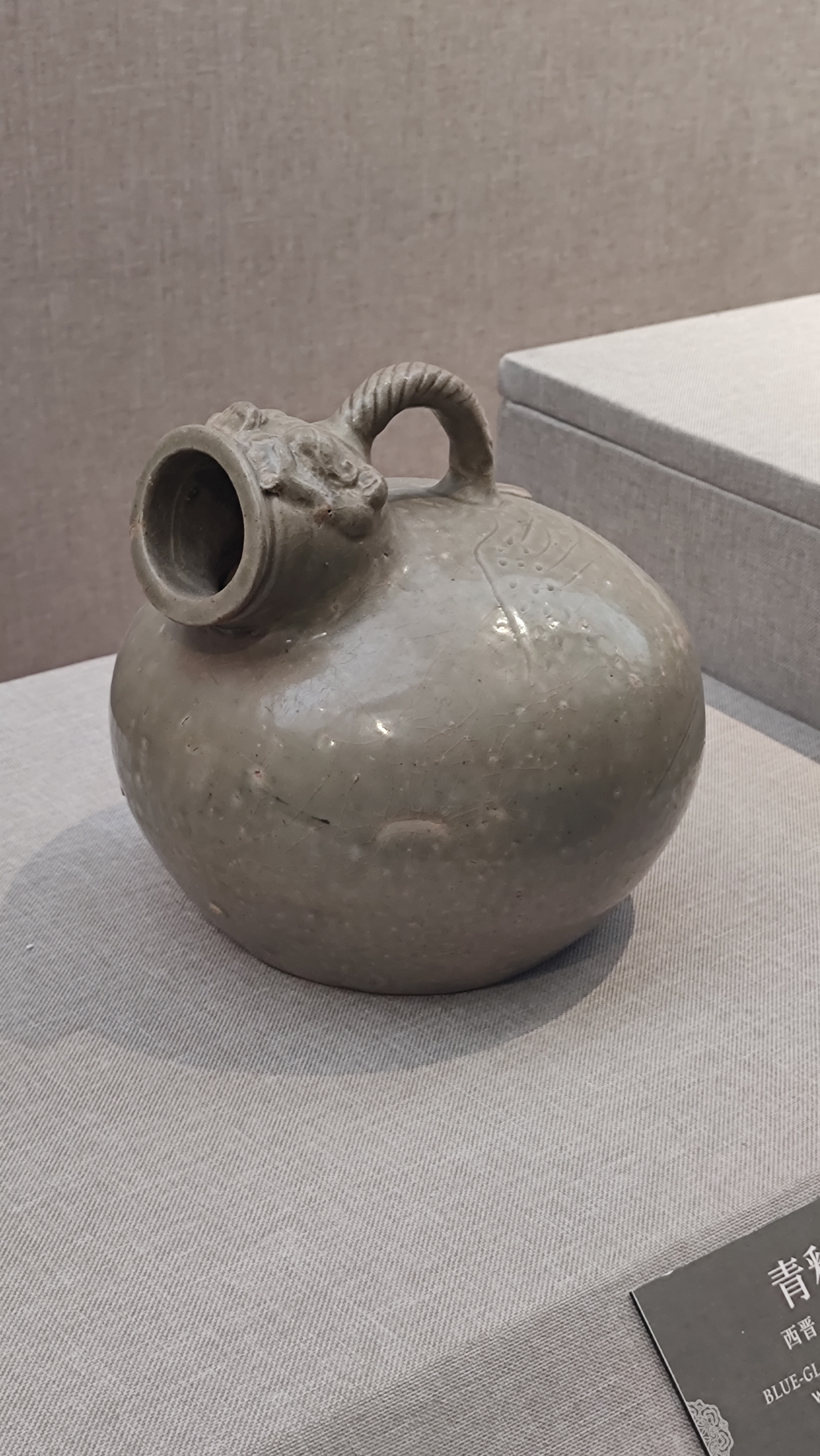
Blue-glazed Chinese urinal chamber pot. Western Jin (265 A.D.–316 A.D.), on display at Zhangjiagang Museum in Zhangjiagang, China.

== Modern use ==
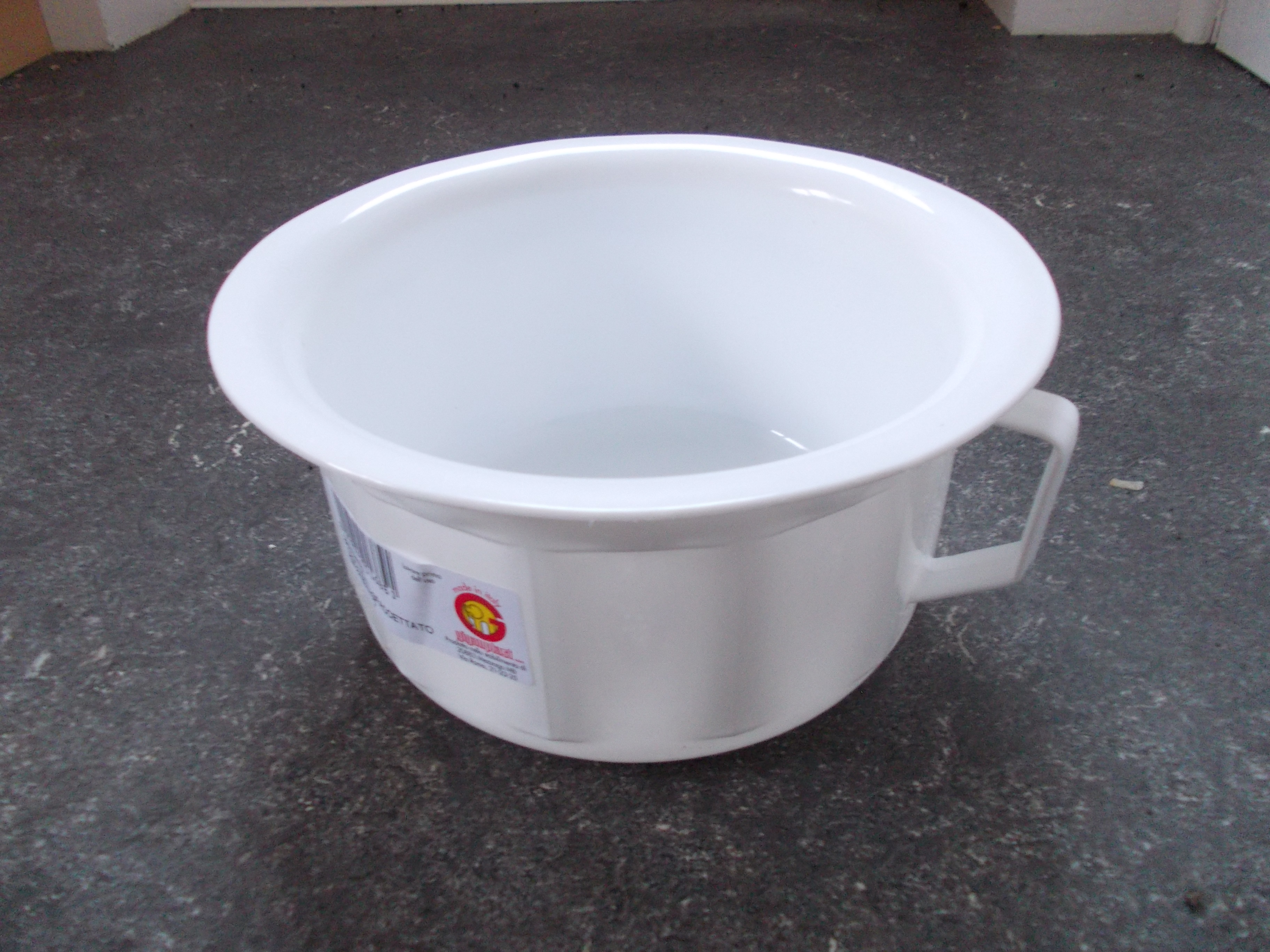
Plastic adult chamber pot

Chamber pots continue to be used today in areas lacking indoor plumbing.

In the Philippines, chamber pots are used as urinals; they are known as arinola in most Philippine languages, such as Cebuano and Tagalog.

In Korea, chamber pots are referred to as yogang (요강). They were used by people who did not have indoor plumbing to avoid the cold elements during the winter months.

=== Children's potties ===
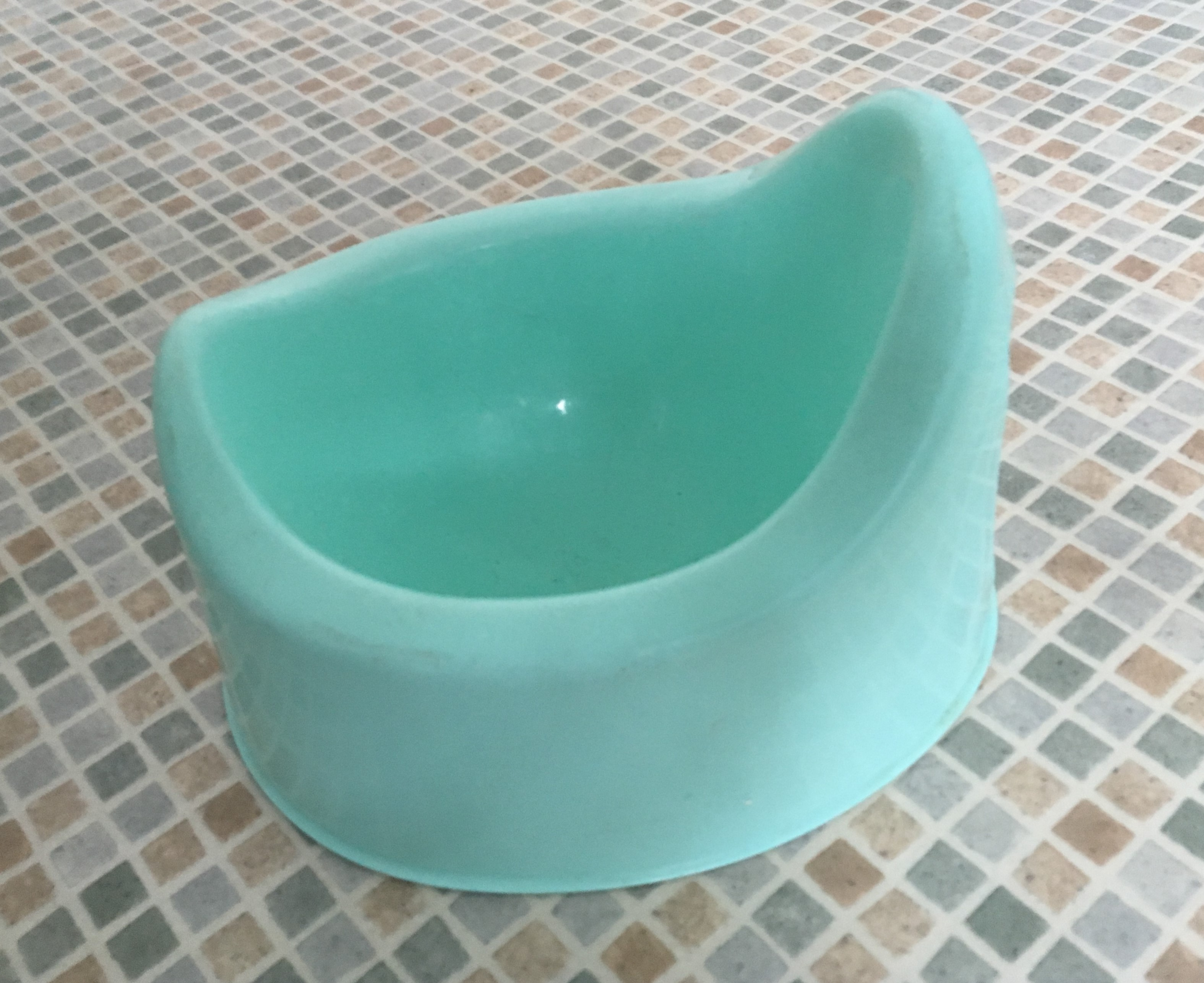
Simple plastic baby's potty

The term "potty" is usually used to refer to the small, toilet-shaped devices made especially for children training to use the toilet, also called potty training, which are similar to chamber pots. These potties are generally a large plastic bowl with an ergonomically designed back and front to protect against splashes. They may have a built-in handle or grasp at the back to allow easy emptying and a non-slip bottom to prevent the child from sliding while in use. Some are given bright colors, and others may feature designs or cartoon characters. In many cases they are used since it is difficult for children to maneuver themselves up onto the normal toilet; in addition the larger opening in the regular toilet is much too wide for a child to sit over comfortably and can be intimidating when they first start learning.

== Shapes and related items ==
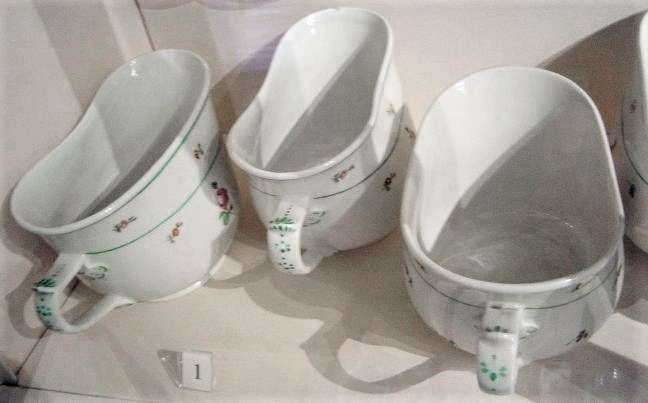
Three bourdaloues

A chamber pot might be disguised in a sort of chair (a close stool). It might be stored in a cabinet with doors to hide it; this sort of nightstand was known as a commode, hence the latter word came to mean "toilet" as well. For homes without these items of furniture, the chamber pot was stored under the bed.

The modern commode toilet and bedpan, used by bedbound or disabled persons, are variants of the chamber pot.

A related item was the bourdalou or bourdaloue, a small handheld oblong ceramic pot used in 17th- and 18th-century France to allow women to urinate conveniently. This item, similar in shape to a deep gravy boat, could be held between the legs and urinated into while standing or crouching, with little risk of soiling their clothing. At the time, women did not customarily wear two-legged underwear as today.

== Cultural references ==
"The Crabfish" is a 17th-century folk song about what is most likely a common lobster, stored in a chamber pot by an unwise fisherman. The moral of the song is that one should look into a chamberpot before using it.

Philippine mythology recounts that giving newlyweds a chamber pot assures them of prosperity. President Elpidio Quirino, as part of a smear campaign against him, was falsely rumoured to possess a golden arinola.

In his satire Utopia, Thomas More had chamberpots made out of gold.

== See also ==
- History of water supply and sanitation
