= Open-crotch pants =

Worn by Chinese children during toilet training

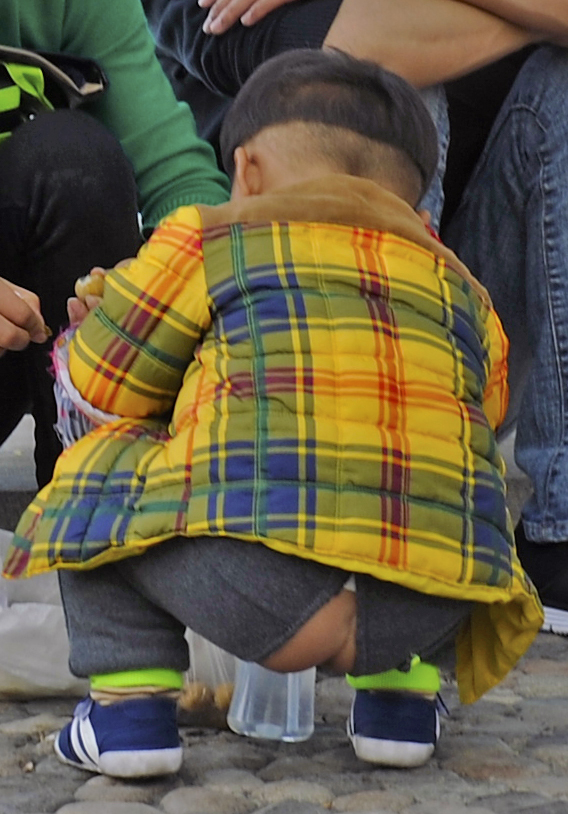
- Chinese boy wearing open-crotch pants at a park in Beijing
- Traditional Chinese: 開襠褲
- Simplified Chinese: 开裆裤
- Literal meaning: Open-crotch pants
Transcriptions
Standard Mandarin
- Hanyu Pinyin: kāidāngkù
Yue: Cantonese
- Yale Romanization: hoi1 dong1 fu3

Open-crotch pants (simplified Chinese: 开裆裤; traditional Chinese: 開襠褲; pinyin: kāidāngkù), also known as open-crotch trousers or split pants, are worn by toddlers throughout mainland China. Often made of thick fabric, they are designed with either an unsewn seam over the buttocks and crotch or a hole over the central buttocks. Both allow children to urinate and defecate without the pants being lowered. The child simply squats, or is held by the parent, eliminating the need for diapers. The sight of the partially exposed buttocks of kaidangku-clad children in public places frequently astonishes foreign visitors, who often photograph them. They have been described as being "as much a sign of China as Chairman Mao's portrait looming over Tiananmen Square".

In China they are often seen as a relic of the country's rural past, with younger mothers, particularly in cities, preferring to diaper their children instead. However, Western advocates of the elimination communication method of toilet training have pointed to the advantages of their use, specifically that children complete their toilet training more quickly and at an earlier age. Other benefits claimed include the elimination of diaper rash and reduction of the environmental problems caused by disposable diapers.

== Use ==
Toilet training begins very early in China, sometimes within days of birth and usually no later than a month. Frequently babies are held closely by parents, grandparents or other extended family members caring for them, sensitive to when they need to relieve themselves. A child who appears ready to urinate or defecate is held over the toilet or any other receptacle available if a commode cannot be reached in time. The adult makes a high-pitched soft whistle while holding the child in a bǎ (Chinese: 把), or bunched-up position, a term sometimes used for the whole process, imitating the sound of running water or urine, to get the child to relax the appropriate muscles.

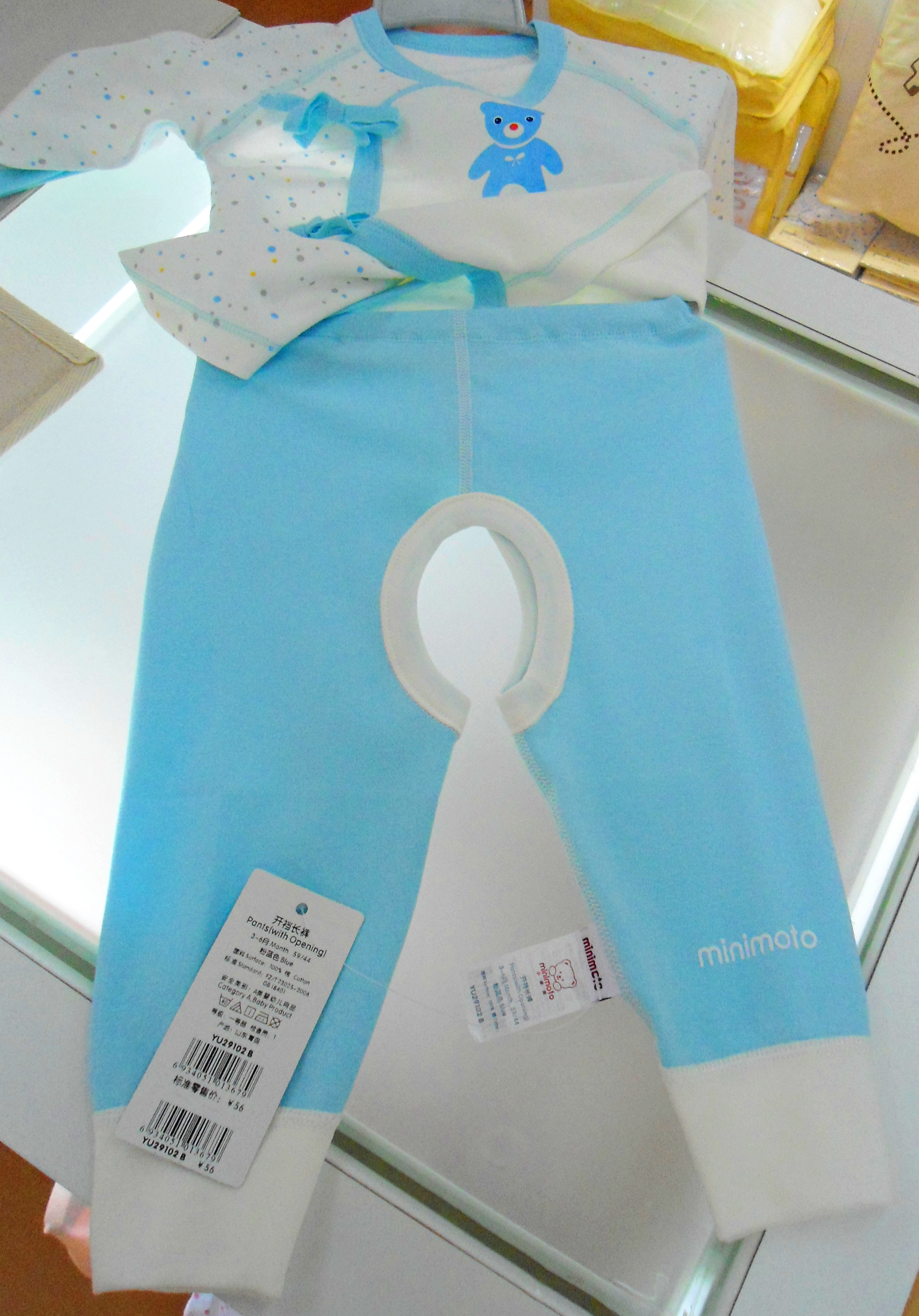
Open-crotch pants for 3- to 6-month-olds, for sale in Haikou

Open-crotch pants are worn when the child is first taken out of the house. Mostly male children wear them; girls (and occasionally some boys) are put in infant-size sundresses. Their use continues even after wearers have gained some control over their bodily functions, since they may not have yet gained the stature or motor skills necessary to use a toilet. Instead, when outdoors, they use a wastebasket or large potted plant. If neither of those is available, caretakers often let the children use the sidewalk or any other available uncovered surface and clean it up themselves afterwards.

== History ==
In 2003 The New York Times described open-crotch pants as having been in use in China for "decades". Seven years earlier, in her memoir Red China Blues, Chinese Canadian journalist Jan Wong speculates that their use evolved from chronic shortages of cloth, soap and water. While those items were in short supply, "people weren't" she wrote. "Someone was always available to ba a Chinese baby."

Their use continued during the 20th century as China modernized in other ways. During the later years of Mao Zedong's rule, brightly colored kaidangku on the streets of Beijing offered a sharp contrast to the austere blue and gray tones of adult clothing prescribed by the Cultural Revolution. Even after the reform and opening up promoted by Deng Xiaoping in the subsequent decades and the ensuing introduction of more Western culture and ideas, they remained in use for the vast majority of children in the People's Republic of China. When Wong, then a Chinese correspondent for Toronto's The Globe and Mail, bore a son in Beijing in 1990, only one hotel in the city sold disposable diapers. Since they charged US$1 apiece, she decided to toilet-train him the traditional Chinese way.

Western manufacturers of consumer products, including disposable diapers, continued to push for entry into the vast Chinese market. In 1998 the American company Procter & Gamble (P&G) was able to introduce its popular Pampers brand to China; competitors soon followed. However, Chinese parents at first saw no reason to abandon kaidangku for diapers, and the company struggled to gain market share. After re-engineering its diapers to be softer and selling them at a lower price than it offered them for in the U.S., P&G launched its "Golden Sleep" campaign in 2007 suggested by its market research, with advertisements claiming that babies slept better in diapers, which could in turn be better for their cognitive development.

Even before that, attitudes had begun to change. Within five years of Pampers' introduction, about $200 million in disposable diapers were being sold in China annually, and many manufacturers reported their sales were growing by double-digit percentages. One of the foreign manufacturers, Japan's Unicharm, said in 2002 that its MamyPoko brand was so popular it was planning to build a plant in China to make them. The shift in attitudes had drastically reduced the use of open-crotch pants—upscale retailers no longer carried them, and Chinese parenting magazines depicted babies wearing diapers exclusively.

Attitudes among Chinese had changed, as well. Mothers the Times talked to in 2003 dismissed kaidangku as out of step with the values of China's growing middle class. "Split pants? That's so old-fashioned!" one Shanghai woman said. "It's not hygienic. It's bad for the environment. Only poor people who live on farms wear them." A Guangzhou woman quoted in China Daily a year later agreed, calling them "uncivilized". People who could afford to buy diapers for their children did so, she asserted, and a Beijing post-natal care center advised mothers to use diapers no matter what the cost.

Zhao Zhongxin, an education professor at Beijing Normal University, said open-crotch pants had become an indicator of socioeconomic status in the new China. "Children in the cities do not wear kaidangku anymore. But children in the countryside still do," he told China Daily. "This is the difference between the minds and living conditions of rural people and urban people," who, the paper added, might also be more mindful of city-government campaigns for cleaner public spaces overall, especially prior to the 2008 Summer Olympics in Beijing, which included exhortations to parents to diaper their children at least for the duration of the Games. A spokeswoman for domestic diaper maker Goodbaby admitted to the newspaper that it was harder to overcome resistance to diaper use outside cities. "Some people, especially farmers, may think they are too wasteful."

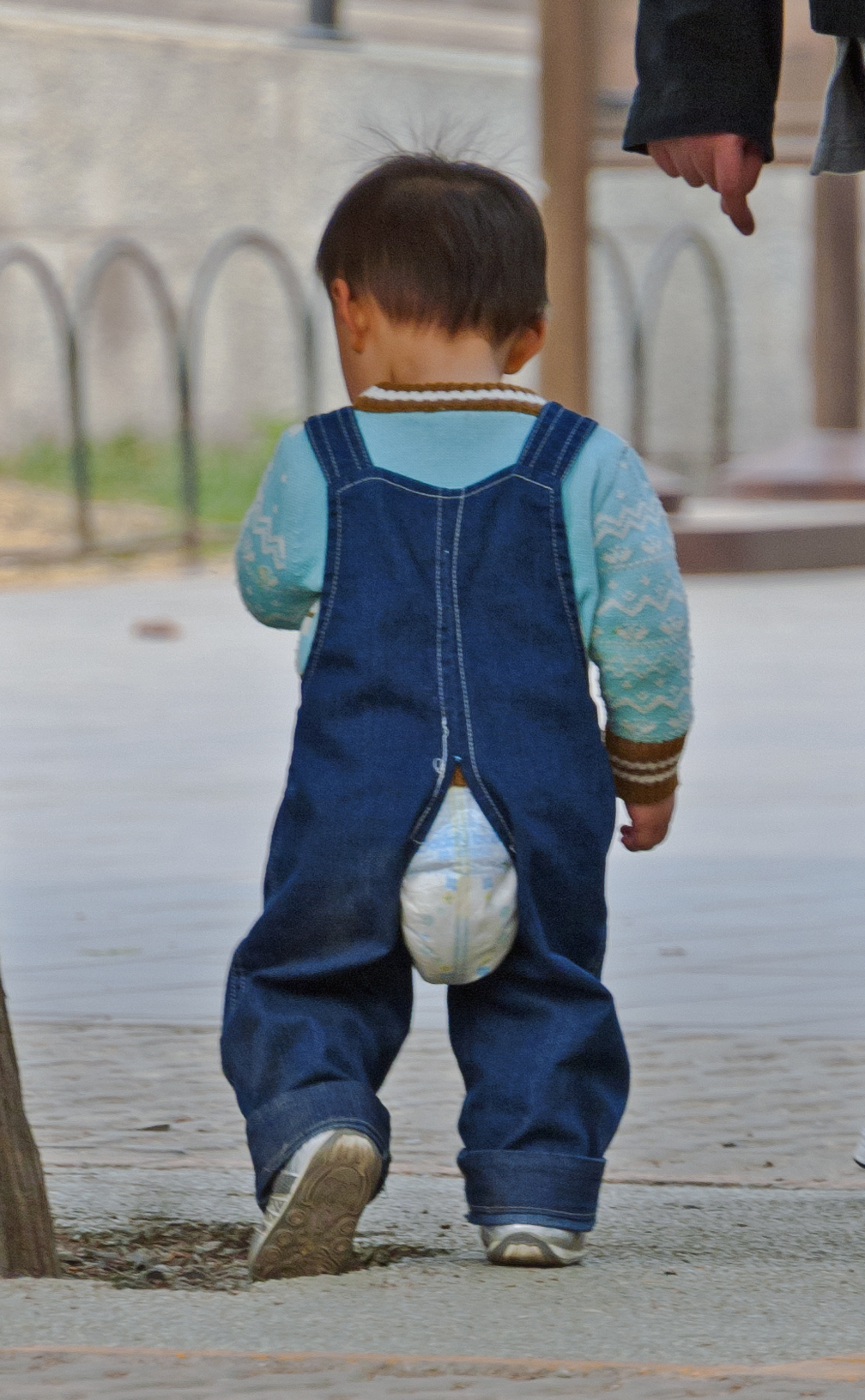
A boy wearing both diapers and kaidangku

Other mothers used both open-crotch pants and diapers depending on the situation. In 2003 the Times reported that they were still frequently seen on hot days in Shanghai, although they were no longer ubiquitous in those conditions. A Zhejiang woman who ran a fruit stand in the city told the newspaper that she dressed her son in them only in that weather, since it was more comfortable for him and reduced the risk of diaper rash. And one Beijing mother whom China Daily spoke to while she watched her kaidangku-clad son at a Beijing playground dismissed opposition to the pants. "Even if people don't think it looks good, that's a minority opinion," she said. "This is a Chinese tradition."

By the end of the decade Pampers had become the top-selling diaper brand in China. Foreign and domestic observers alike confidently predicted the demise of kaidangku. In 2010 Brandchannel called them "a fading memory". Yet reports from China early in the next decade suggested their use continued.

== Advantages and disadvantages ==
Despite the increasing prevalence of diaper use, which became a $3-billion industry in the country by 2010, enough Chinese parents still use open-crotch pants, or consider doing so, for parenting websites in that language to list their benefits and detriments to better help parents make an informed decision. Among the former are that their use offsets the infant's inability to communicate, eliminates the need for scheduled toileting times and greatly reduces the need to wash soiled clothing. Most frequently cited is the ability to begin and finish toilet training earlier. It is not uncommon for infants in kaidangku to begin being toilet trained before their first birthday and be fully trained around that milestone or shortly afterwards, before most of their Western counterparts have even begun. During a 1981 visit to a Beijing preschool, Fox Butterfield, then a Chinese correspondent for The New York Times, reported that he expressed skepticism from his own contemporaneous parenting experience over the possibility that children that young could be successfully toilet trained, only to have it immediately dispelled by a 14-month-old girl's timely use of the spittoon provided for her.

However, parents are cautioned that kaidangku can be dirtier, leading to a higher risk of problems like urethritis, cystitis and other complications of urinary tract infections. Children in them are also believed to face a higher risk of frostbite in winter, and 163.com warns that boys with easy access to their exposed genitals "can easily develop bad habits". Goodbaby, the Shanghai-based diaper maker, lists some other problems with open-crotch pants on its website. In addition to the medical, sanitary and environmental drawbacks, it says that they show no respect for the child's privacy and that he may in the future be embarrassed by photographs of himself wearing them, particularly as they become less common. While it admits that kaidangku use results merely from different cultural values and not ignorance, it counsels, "we must admit foreign practices are more rigorous and show more respect for the child."

Wong, in her memoir, describes another negative side effect. In the early 1990s, she reported on China's leading penis-enlargement surgeon. Many of his patients were men who, as children on farms, suffered serious injury to their organs when they squatted in their open-crotch pants in areas where dogs or pigs ate their own feces and the animals bit the boys' penises in the confusion. Some had never married because of the injury. "China desperately needed a Pampers factory, or at least a dog-food industry," she wrote.

Lastly, in his 1996 memoir The Attic, artist Guanlong Cao recalls an incidental benefit of kaidangku to his parents:

When [my sister] Chuen was three years old, she still wore open-crotch pants that revealed two banana-shaped slices of her bottom. She liked to climb the wooden ladder that leaned against the south window. The slanted roof outside the window was a constant temptation to her. But she was only allowed to climb three steps, poke her head outside, and sneak a peek at the world. As soon as her little foot moved toward the fourth rung of the ladder, a slap on the bottom was guaranteed. In addition to the hygienic convenience, I presume this was another technical advantage of the classic open-crotch pants.

== Use in West ==
As Chinese parents were migrating from kaidangku to diapers, some Western parents were going in the opposite direction, concerned about the environmental impact of used disposable diapers and the health effects on the child. In her 2006 book Diaper Free, Ingrid Bauer bemoaned the marketing success of diaper manufacturers in China. "The traditional kaidangku have rapidly disappeared from the major cities in the last half-decade and are rapidly being replaced by diapers ... Aggressive advertisers create an impression that consumer products are vastly superior to what mothers have practiced for eons and urge parents to buy what they can barely afford," she wrote.

Around that same time, inspired by the Chinese example, parents in the U.S. and other Western countries began forming "diaper-free" support groups and practicing elimination communication toilet training on younger babies, using the ba whistling sound to incite urination. Some that The New York Times talked to in 2005 suggested they had gone to that city's Chinatown to purchase open-crotch pants for their own children. Western parents working in China also saw the use of kaidangku up close, and in some cases decided to emulate Chinese methods in toilet training their own children.

== See also ==
- Infant clothing
- Swaddling, a type of infant clothing once dismissed as old-fashioned but increasingly used
