= Down by Law =

Down by Law may refer to:

- Down by Law (band), an American punk rock band
  - Down by Law (Down by Law album), their 1991 debut album
- Down by Law (film), a 1986 film by Jim Jarmusch
- Down by Law (Deadline album), 1985
- Down by Law (MC Shan album), 1987
