= Dunstan Baby Language =

Hypothesis about infantile vocal reflexes

Dunstan Baby Language is a hypothesis about infantile vocal reflexes as signals, in humans. The hypothesis is that across cultures and linguistic groups there are five sounds, each with a meaning, that are used by infants before the language acquisition period. The hypothesis was developed by Australian former mezzo-soprano, Priscilla Dunstan, and has been featured on The Oprah Winfrey Show. In a 2023 Nature paper, researchers have not been able to validate Dunstan's theory, and only found infant cries to carry age and identity information.

== Dunstan's hypothesis ==
Between 0–3 months, infants make what Dunstan calls "sound reflexes." According to Dunstan, we all have reflexes, like sneezes, hiccups, and burps, that all have a recognizable pattern when sound is added to the reflex. There are other reflexes that all babies experience, and when sound is added to these, a distinct, preemptive "cry" will occur before the infant breaks into what Dunstan calls the hysterical cry. Dunstan states that these preemptive cries can indicate what the infant requires (e.g., food, comfort, sleep), and they escalate to the hysterical cry if they are not answered. As the infant matures past 3 months in vocalization, the sound reflexes become replaced with more elaborate babbling.

=== Words (sound reflexes) ===
According to Dunstan, there are five universal words (or "sound reflexes") used by infants.

- Neh (I am hungry) – An infant uses the sound reflex "Neh" to communicate its hunger. The sound is produced when the sucking reflex is triggered, and the tongue is pushed up on the roof of the mouth.
- Owh (I'm sleepy) – An infant uses the sound reflex "Owh" to communicate that they are tired. The sound is produced much like an audible yawn.
- Heh (I'm experiencing discomfort) – An infant uses the sound reflex "Heh" to communicate stress, discomfort, or perhaps that it needs a fresh diaper. The sound is produced by a response to a skin reflex, such as feeling sweat or itchiness in the bum.
- Eair (I have lower gas) – An infant uses the sound reflex "Eair" to communicate they have flatulence or an upset stomach. The sound is produced when trapped air from a belch is unable to release and travels to the stomach where the muscles of the intestines tighten to force the air bubble out. Often, this sound will indicate that a bowel movement is in progress, and the infant will bend its knees, bringing the legs toward the torso. This leg movement assists in the ongoing process.
- Eh (I need to be burped) – An infant uses the sound reflex "Eh" to communicate that it needs to be burped. The sound is produced when a large bubble of trapped air is caught in the chest, and the reflex is trying to release this out of the mouth.

Dunstan states that she has a photographic memory for sounds and that this, combined with her years in the opera and her experience as a mother, allowed her to recognize certain sounds in the human voice. A DVD set called The Dunstan Baby Language was released by Dunstan in November 2006. The two-disc set covered the five universal words of the language, methods of learning how to recognize the vocalizations and sounds, numerous examples of baby cries from around the world to "tune your ear," and live demonstrations of newborn mother groups experimenting with the language.

== Criticism ==
Linguistics experts point out that Dunstan's hypothesis has not been subjected to rigorous testing or academic scrutiny. In fact, in 2023 researchers tested the hypothesis and could not demonstrate it to be true. The Dunstan company had, at one time, developed a clinical trial plan with Brown University researchers to test its claims, but abandoned it for consumer surveys and small-group observations in order "to hasten the development of a system that could be used by parents," skipping rigorous testing to go straight to market.

== See also ==
- Baby sign language
- Baby talk
- Confirmation bias
- Elimination communication
- Fis phenomenon
