= Sensodyne =

Dental hygiene product for sensitive teeth

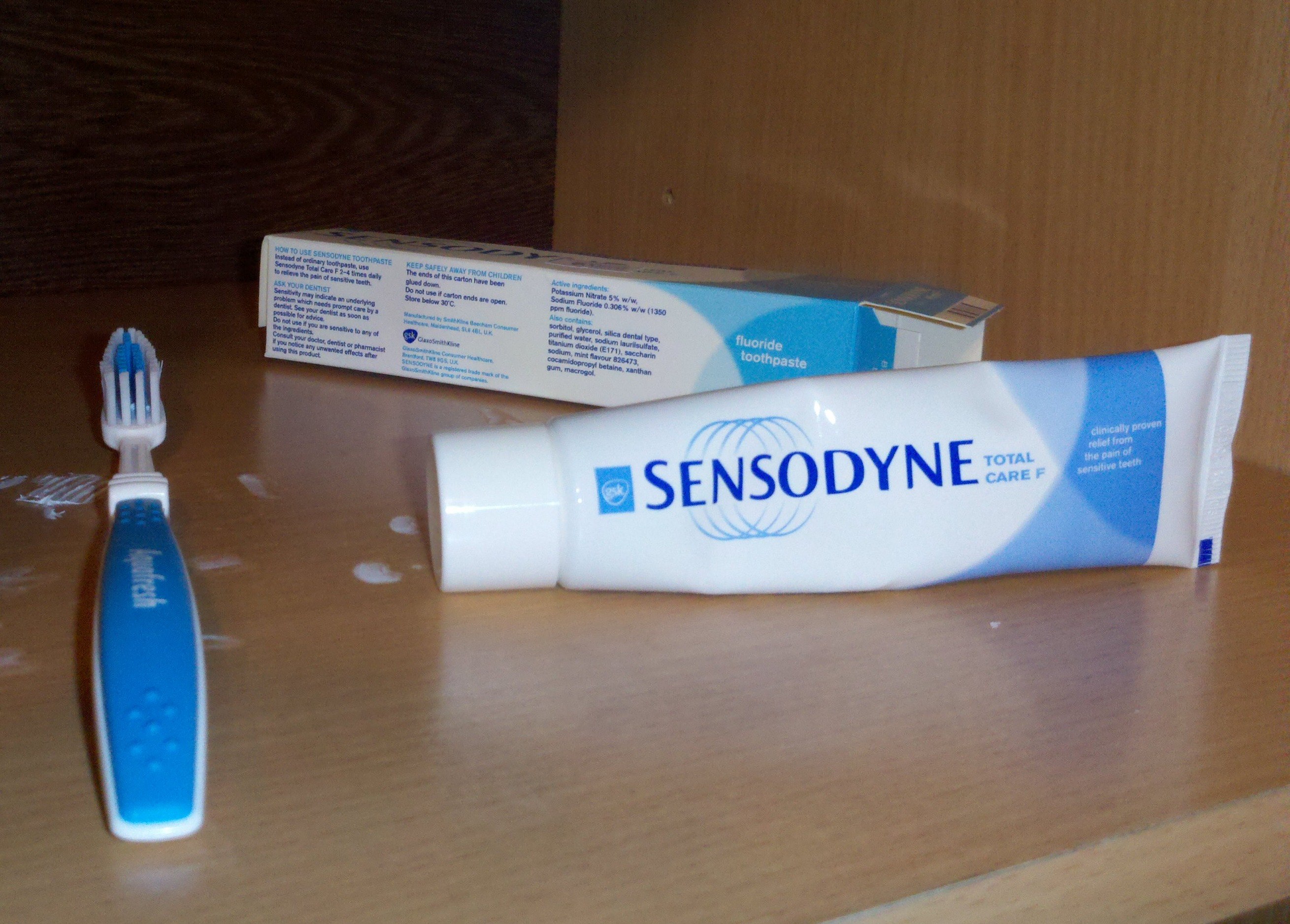
- Sensodyne toothpaste
- Product type: Toothpaste
- Current owner: Haleon
- Country: United Kingdom
- Introduced: 1961; 65 years ago
- Related brands: Aquafresh; Biotene
- Markets: Worldwide
- Previous owners: Block Drug; GSK
- Website: www.sensodyne.com

Sensodyne is a British brand of toothpaste and mouthwash targeted at people with sensitive teeth. Sensodyne is owned by Haleon and is marketed under the name Shumitect in Japan.

== Effectiveness and ingredients ==
Sensodyne toothpastes work in different ways depending on the product's active ingredient—potassium nitrate, strontium acetate/chloride.

=== Potassium nitrate ===
The potassium ion hyperpolarizes the nerve and stops it from firing. The nerve impulses are thus desensitized and there is no pain.

=== Strontium acetate and strontium chloride ===
These compounds share a similar chemical structure to calcium. Strontium based toothpastes (acetate and chloride) are therefore able to replace some of the lost calcium and block the exposed tubules in the dentinal tissue. This helps prevent the movement of the fluid within the tubules in response to a sensitivity stimulus that could otherwise cause tooth pain.

=== Calcium sodium phosphosilicate ===
Some Sensodyne products contain calcium sodium phosphosilicate (CSPS, Novamin), which appears to help with tooth sensitivity. A randomized clinical trial published in 2015 demonstrated that dentifrices containing 5% CSPS may have the potential to mineralize and occlude the dentine in the oral environment. Sensodyne products sold in the United States do not contain calcium sodium phosphosilicate (Novamin).

== History ==
Sensodyne was first sold by Block Drug, a Brooklyn, New York-based company established in 1907 by pharmacist Alexander Block.

By 1925, manufacturing dental care products had become the company's focus. Leonard N. Block followed his father into the family business which relocated to Jersey City, New Jersey, in 1938.

In 2000, Block Drug was purchased by Smith Kline Beecham P.L.C., which became GlaxoSmithKline (NYSE:GSK).

The toothpaste was first marketed in 1961 as a desensitising toothpaste based on a strontium chloride formulation. In 1980, Sensodyne launched a new toothpaste containing potassium nitrate, a mild local sedative.

Sensodyne became a part of Haleon, a British multinational consumer healthcare corporation, in July 2022, following the establishment of Haleon as a separate entity through a corporate spin-off from GSK.

== Product counterfeits and recall ==
In 2007, GlaxoSmithKline tracked down counterfeit producers of Sensodyne after a consumer in Panama noted diethylene glycol, a poisonous ingredient commonly found in antifreeze, on the label of his toothpaste.

On July 15, 2015, GlaxoSmithKline Consumer Healthcare announced a recall of certain lots of Sensodyne Repair & Protect toothpaste as well as Sensodyne Complete toothpaste due to the possible presence of wood fragments in the products. The recall also applied to the company's Biotene brand of toothpaste. The recall was a precautionary measure based on a small number of complaints, and no injuries have been reported. The recall applies to products manufactured between 2013 and September 2014, and shipped from June 2013 to April 2015.

== See also ==
- List of toothpaste brands
- Index of oral health and dental articles
