= List of toothpaste brands =

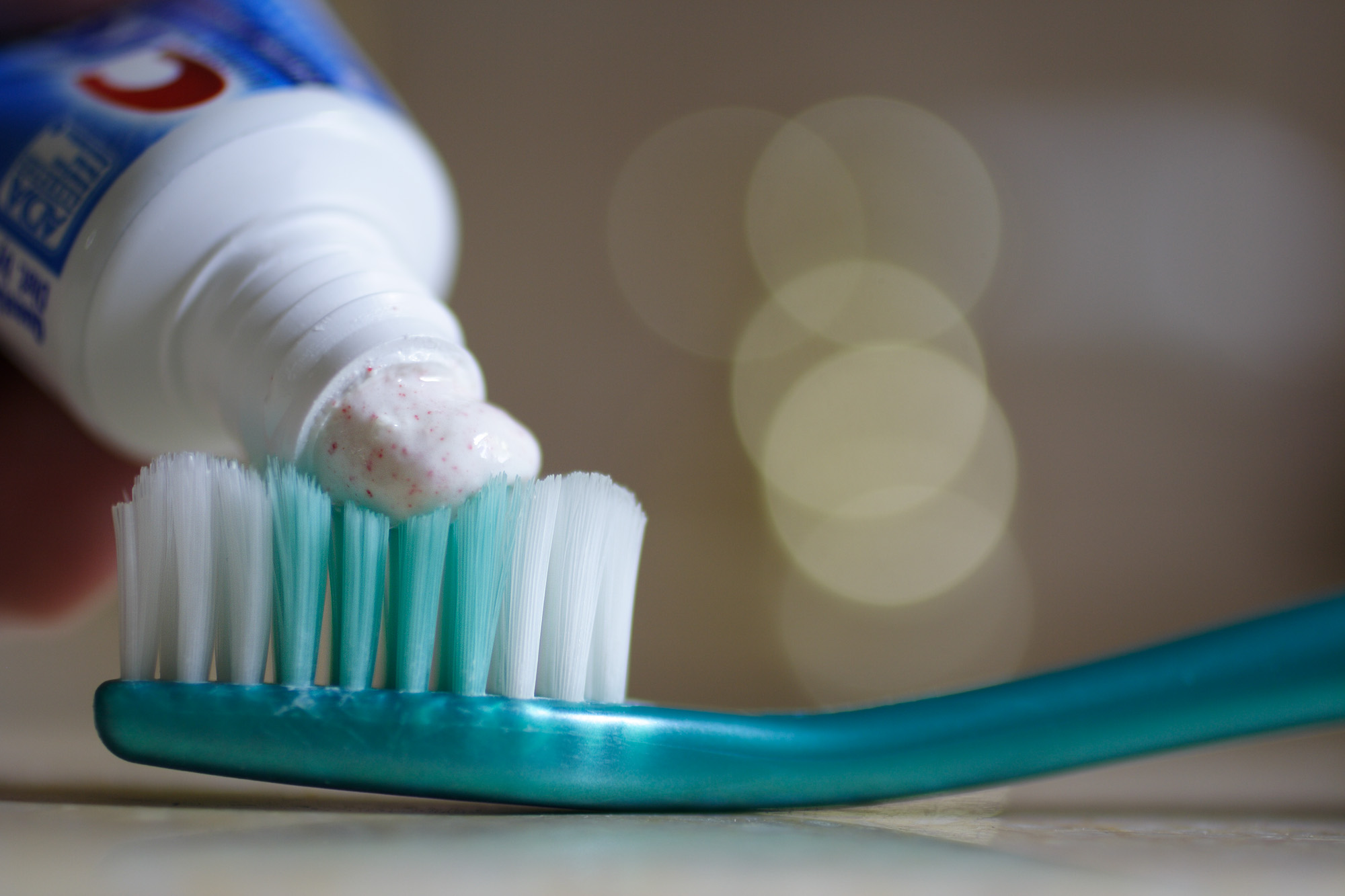
Toothpaste from a tube being applied to a toothbrush

Toothpaste is a gel dentifrice used in conjunction with a toothbrush to help clean and maintain the aesthetics and health of teeth. Toothpaste is used to promote oral hygiene; it functions as an abrasive agent that helps to remove dental plaque and food from the teeth, works to suppress halitosis, and delivers active ingredients such as fluoride or xylitol to the teeth and gums to help prevent tooth decay (cavity) and gum disease (gingivitis).

== Toothpastes ==
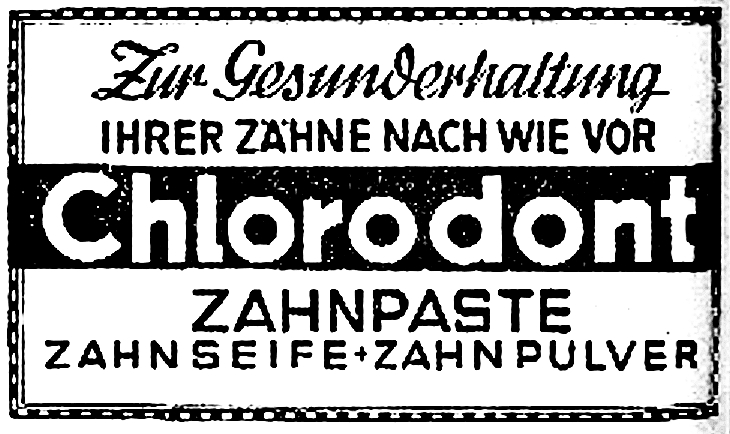
A 1949 Chlorodont advertisement, published in Germany's Voice (a New York publication)

This list includes notable brands of toothpaste, both historic and contemporary.

- Aim: a brand of toothpaste from Church and Dwight. Aim was introduced in 1973 by Unilever, and the brand was purchased by Church and Dwight in 2003. In Australia, it is manufactured and distributed by Pental.
- Aquafresh: available since 1973, it is manufactured by consumer healthcare product maker Haleon.
- Babool: launched in by Balsara Hygiene in 1987, Babool is made from the bark of the Babool tree, which has traditionally been used to clean teeth in India.
- Bentodent: launched in by Indian Dental Organization, a team of dentists to help resolve specific oral care issues using natural and sustainable oral care products, Bentodent is made with Bentonite clay, an old age cleanser in India.
- Binaca: an oral hygiene brand that is marketed in India and owned by Dabur.
- BlueM: a leading oral health brand based in The Netherlands
- BioMin Technologies Limited: BioMin C and BioMin F toothpaste
- Biorepair : Italian toothpast with bio enamel repair
- Cedel: Australian brand owned by Heritage Brands launched their spearmint soft poilish toothpaste in 1970, but discontinued their oral care products range in 2024.
- Chlorodont: Saxon brand by Ottomar von Mayenburg (Dresden, 1907)
- Cleure: independently owned flavor-free, mint-free, fluoride-free, SLS-free toothpaste made in the U.S. Dermatologist recommended for sensitive skin, dry mouth, canker sores and perioral dermatitis.
- Close-Up: marketed by Unilever, it was launched in 1967 and was the first gel toothpaste in the world.
- Colgate: marketed by Colgate-Palmolive, it is the first toothpaste in a collapsible tube, introduced in 1896, after having been sold in glass jars since 1873.
- Corsodyl: Corsodyl, also known as Parodontax, is a fluoride-based toothpaste that is meant to cure and prevent gum bleeding and gingivitis. It was first produced by GlaxoSmithKline in 1937 (although it is now produced by Haleon). It is available in over 30 countries including the Republic of Ireland, the United Kingdom, and Germany. The active ingredient that makes this toothpaste unique is chlorhexidine. It also contains sodium bicarbonate, which is what gives it a slight salty taste.
- Crest: a Procter & Gamble product. At first, it used stannous fluoride, marketed as "Fluoristan" (this was also the original brand name it was sold under—it was later changed from "Fluoristan" to "Crest with Fluoristan"). Sold as Blend-A-Med in some European markets.
- Dabur: first introduced in India by Dr. S. K. Burman in 1884.
- Dant Kanti: introduced in India by Patanjali Ayurved. It is now one of the top selling toothpaste brands in India.
- Darlie: first manufactured in Shanghai in 1933 and later based in Hong Kong and Taiwan, Hawley & Hazel was acquired in 1985 by the United States corporation Colgate-Palmolive, although the product is not marketed by Colgate-Palmolive.
- Davids Natural Toothpaste: founded in 2015 by Eric David Buss with a focus on natural ingredients, sustainability, and performance. Davids does not use fluoride, and has trademarked Hydroxi™, a proprietary blend of nano-hydroxyapatite and natural ingredients after lab testing showed it outperformed leading toothpastes in occluding dentin tubules.
- Doramad Radioactive Toothpaste: produced from 1940 to 1945 in Germany by Auergesellschaft of Berlin, it contained small amounts of thorium, although later analysis showed its radioactivity levels to be very low.
- Dr. Lyon's Tooth Powder: a brand of powdered dentifrice mainly popular during the mid twentieth century. It is still available today in independent drug stores and certain drug store chains. Created by Dr. I. W. Lyon, D.D.S.
- Elmex: sold since 1962, was manufactured by GABA International AG, a Swiss manufacturer of branded oral care products. GABA International AG was acquired by Colgate-Palmolive in December 2003.
- Euthymol: a brand of antiseptic, fluoride-free toothpaste distributed by Johnson & Johnson that is characterised by its bright pink colour and medicinal taste. The antiseptic ingredient in the product is thymol.
- Formula: an oral care brand from Indonesia since 1984, it was owned by PT Ultra Prima Abadi company and marketed through OT consumer goods brand.
- Gleem: a brand of toothpaste made by the Procter & Gamble company.
- Grants of Australia is an Australian brand of oral hygiene
- GUM, made by Sunstar
- Hapee: a Filipino toothpaste brand marketed by Lamoiyan Corporation, a Filipino-owned company founded in 1988 by Cecilio K. Pedro.
- Ipana a popular toothpaste during the 20th century, first introduced in 1901 by Bristol-Myers of New York. The brand is now owned by Maxill Inc. of Canada. The famous Disney-created mascot named Bucky Beaver joined the Ipana marketing efforts in the 1950s.
- Jāsön offers toothpaste among a variety of other personal care products. Jāsön is a brand of Hain Celestial.
- Kalodont: discontinued in 1981, it was originally produced by F. A. Sarg’s Sohn & Co. from Vienna and first sold in Austria-Hungary in 1887. It later became widely distributed, in 34 other countries, and obtained a near-monopoly status that caused the word "kalodont" to become synonymous with the word for "tooth paste" in South Slavic languages. It was also available in Russia in 1927.
- Macleans: a brand of toothpaste by GlaxoSmithKline, introduced in UK in the 1930s by the Maclean's Company which was taken over by the Beecham Group and eventually by SKB. Sold and made in many countries and available in the U.S. until the early 1980s, now marketed in Australia and New Zealand.
- Marvis: Italian toothpaste brand registered in Florence in 1958, originally marketed to smokers for its intense mint flavour. Acquired in 1997 by Ludovico Martelli, the company behind Proraso, and relaunched as a premium brand known for its retro aluminium tubes.
- KIN: Laboratios KIN is a Spanish brand of oral hygiene products that focuses on specific needs of the user, i.e., GingiKIN for gingivitis, Gingikin B5 for Gingivitis and prevents tooth decay, KINfresh for bad breath, and sensiKIN for sensitive teeth.
- Kodomo: a brand of children's toothpaste manufactured by Lion.
- Kolynos is an old-time line of oral care products that was created by Newell Sill Jenkins in 1908 and acquired by Colgate-Palmolive in 1995. Although not now readily available in the U.S., the brand remains strong in Latin America, and also manufactured in Hungary. In Brazil, for instance, Kolynos was the second best-selling brand, after Colgate (toothpaste).
- K P Namboodiri's herbal toothpaste is an ayurvedic dental product manufactured by Ramco Herbals pvt ltd and marketed by K P Namboodiri's Ayurvedics based from Shornur, Kerala, India.
- Maxam: a mainland Chinese brand, products include toothpaste and other personal care products.
- Mentadent: a brand name for a line of dental products manufactured by Unilever everywhere but United States and Canada, where it was acquired by the Church & Dwight Company in 2003.
- Mentadent SR formerly named "Gibbs SR", is a brand of toothpaste owned by Unilever.
- Meswak: launched in India by Balsara Hygiene' in 1998, it is marketed as a herbal toothpaste. It is prepared from extracts of the Salvadora persica plant.
- Oral-B: a brand of the Procter & Gamble company. Oral-B is an American brand of oral hygiene products, including toothpastes, toothbrushes, electric toothbrushes, and mouthwashes. It has been owned by American multinational Procter & Gamble (P&G) since 2006.
- Oxygenol: Finnish toothpaste brand manufactured by Finnish Company Berner Oy
- Parodontax: A brand of Haleon a fluoride-based toothpaste that is meant to cure and prevent gum bleeding and gingivitis. It was first produced by GlaxoSmithKline in 1937. It is available in over 30 countries including the Republic of Ireland, the United Kingdom, and Germany. The active ingredient that makes this toothpaste unique is chlorhexidine. It also contains sodium bicarbonate, which is what gives it a slight salty taste.
- Peak toothpaste; a brand of toothpaste featuring baking soda produced by Colgate-Palmolive, circa 1973–1977.
- Pepsodent: a brand of toothpaste owned Church & Dwight (United States and Canada) and Unilever (rest of the world) by with a minty flavour derived from sassafras. It was advertised for its purported properties fighting tooth decay, attributed in advertisements to the supposed ingredient Irium. Irium is another word for sodium lauryl sulfate, an inexpensive ionic surfactant. It was introduced in the U.S. in 1915 by the Pepsodent Company of Chicago, which was purchased by Unilever in 1944.
- Pomorin by Rubella is one of the most well-known Bulgarian toothpastes for its rich content of sea salts and Black sea lye, useful in treatment of periodontal disease.
- Promise: launched by Balsara hygiene in 1978 in India, the brand's tagline was "The unique toothpaste with time-tested clove oil."
- P/S: a Vietnamese brand of toothpaste and toothbrush. However, in 2012, they made 3 actions called "P/S 123".
- Rembrandt toothpaste: a brand of toothpaste that has built its brand on the promise of whitening.
- R.O.C.S.: "unique toothpastes, which are made with natural ingredients using their own low-temperature technology, under the R.O.C.S. brand."
- Sensodyne: a brand of toothpaste by Haleon, marketed for people with sensitive teeth and/or dentine hypersensitivity.
- Signal: marketed by the British Unilever.
- Sozodont: a popular brand of oral hygiene product from the mid-nineteenth century to the early twentieth century. According to an 1889 issue of the journal American Druggist, Sozodont was made from a liquid and powder mixture. The powder contained orris root, carbonate of calcium, and magnesia. The liquid contained castile soap (soap made exclusively from vegetable oil), glycerin, sizable portions of water and alcohol, and, for flavoring, a small quantity of oil of peppermint, clover, cinnamon, and star anise, as well as, for coloring, cochineal (a dye made from an insect of the same name).
- Stomatol: first sold in Sweden at the beginning of the 20th century, it was particularly notable as having been one of the first Swedish brands to recognize and to use the power of mass media.
- Stripe with hexachlorophene: Marketed by Lever Brothers.
- TartarEnd: founded by John Gontarz, Phd, only toothpaste which actually removes tartar when used according to manufacturer's directions. TartarEnd softens tartar so that it can be removed by brushing or flossing.
- TheraBreath: Founded by dentist Harold Katz in 1994, later sold to Church & Dwight
- Tom's of Maine: founded by Tom and Kate Chappell in 1970 with US$5,000. In 2006, a controlling 84% stake in Tom's of Maine was purchased by Colgate-Palmolive for US$100 million. The Chappells own the remaining sixteen percent.
- Ultra Brite: an American toothpaste and tooth-whitener marketed by Colgate-Palmolive in the United States.
- White Birch: a brand of toothpaste with White Charcoal. White Birch is a brand of Total Clean LLC which has the patent on white charcoal in oral care formulations.
- White Glo: established in New South Wales in 1993.
- Zendium: a brand of toothpaste made by Unilever and marketed in the Netherlands, Belgium, Germany and Scandinavia for some years, with its expansion into the French and Italian markets in 2015.

== See also ==
- Dental care
- List of dental topics
