= Wyeth =

American pharmaceutical company

Wyeth Pharmaceuticals Inc.
- Final logo by Landor from 2002 to 2009.
- Formerly: American Home Products Corporation
- Type: Public
- Traded as: NYSE: AHP (until 2002); NYSE: WYE (2002–2009)
- Industry: Pharmaceuticals, healthcare
- Founded: Philadelphia, Pennsylvania, U.S. (1860)
- Fate: Acquired by Pfizer. After being acquired by Pfizer, nutritional division is sold to Nestlé while consumer healthcare division is merged with GSK's consumer healthcare division to form Haleon.
- Number of locations: Collegeville, Pennsylvania and Madison, New Jersey United States
- Key people: Bernard J. Poussot, CEO, President and Vice Chairman of Wyeth; Robert Essner, Chairman; Joseph Mahady, President, Global Business, Wyeth Pharmaceuticals; John Wyeth, Founder
- Products: Premarin, Effexor, Enbrel, (See more products.)
- Brands: Bonakid, Promil
- Revenue: ▲US$ 22.4 billion (2008)
- Net income: ▲US$ 4.6 billion (2008)
- Number of employees: 49,732 (2005)
- Parent: Pfizer (prescription products), Haleon (consumer healthcare), Nestlé (nutritional products)
- Website: (now part of Pfizer) was www.wyeth.com

Wyeth Pharmaceuticals Inc. was a pharmaceutical company until it was purchased by Pfizer in 2009. The company was founded in Philadelphia, Pennsylvania, in 1860 as John Wyeth and Brother. Its headquarters moved to Collegeville, Pennsylvania, and Madison, New Jersey, before its headquarters were consolidated with Pfizer's in New York City after the 2009 merger.

Wyeth manufactured over-the-counter (OTC) drugs Robitussin and the analgesic Advil (ibuprofen) as well as prescription drugs Premarin and Effexor.

== History ==
=== 1860–1899 ===
In 1860, pharmacists John (1834–1907) and Frank Wyeth opened a drugstore with a small research lab on Walnut Street in Philadelphia. In 1862, on the suggestion of doctors, they began to manufacture large quantities of commonly ordered medicines. They were successful. In 1864, they began supplying medicines and beef extract to the Union army during the Civil War.

In 1872, Henry Bower, an employee of Wyeth, developed one of the first rotary compressed tablet machines in the United States. This enabled the mass production of medicines with unprecedented precision and speed. It was successful, and the Wyeth brothers won multiple awards at the Centennial Exhibition. In 1883, Wyeth opened its first international facility in Montreal, Canada, and began vaccine production. Six years later, a fire destroyed the brothers' original Walnut Street store. They sold the retail business and focused on mass production.

=== 1900–1929 ===
John Wyeth died in 1907. His only son, Stuart, became the company's president. The Whitehall building in downtown Manhattan became the corporation's first headquarters. Global sales increased due to the sales of Wyeth's Kolynos brand of toothpaste. In 1929, Stuart Wyeth died and left controlling interest to Harvard University.

=== 1930–1949 ===
In 1930, the Wyeth company purchased Anacin, a product for tension headaches which quickly became the company's flagship product. One year later, Harvard sold Wyeth to American Home Products for US$2.9 million.

In 1935, Alvin G. Brush, a Certified Public Accountant, became CEO of the organization and served for 30 years. Under Brush's leadership, 34 new companies were acquired in 15 years, including Chef Boyardee and the S.M.A. Corporation, a pharmaceutical firm specializing in infant formulas. Wyeth also made its first licensing deal, acquiring an antibiotic for arthritis vaccine research.

In 1941, the US entered World War II, and Wyeth shipped typical wartime drugs such as sulfa bacteriostatics, blood plasma, typhus vaccine, quinine, and atabrine tablets. Wyeth was later rewarded for its contribution to the war effort. During this time, Wyeth launched its penicillin research facility with G. Raymond Rettew. In 1943, Wyeth purchased G. Washington Coffee Refining Company, an instant coffee company created by early 20th century Belgian inventor George Washington.

In 1943, Wyeth merged with Ayerst, McKenna and Harrison, Ltd. of Canada. With this merger came Premarin, the world's first conjugated estrogen medicine, which was a flagship product for Wyeth until 2002, when preliminary results from the Women's Health Initiative linked combined estrogen plus progestin to a number of negative effects, including increased risk for breast cancer. Sales subsequently decreased worldwide.

Wyeth was one of 22 companies selected by the government in 1944 to manufacture penicillin for the military, and later for the general public.

In 1945, Wyeth acquired the Fort Dodge Serum Company, entering the animal health field.

=== 1950–1969 ===
In 1951, Wyeth launched Antabuse, a drug for the treatment of alcoholism, as well as the antihistamine Phenergan. Ansolyen was launched the next year as a high blood pressure medication. The anticonvulsant Mysoline was introduced in 1954. Other drugs introduced during this time include Isordil, a vasodilator for treatment of angina, Dryvax, a freeze-dried smallpox vaccine, and Ovral, a combined oral contraceptive pill. Pharmaceuticals were generating an ever-increasing percentage of Wyeth's sales.

Wyeth became a leading US vaccine producer after supplying polio vaccine for Salk trials. The corporate headquarters were moved to Radnor, Pennsylvania, where they remained until 2003. William F. Laporte became the Chairman and President of AHP in 1965. He served until 1981.

The World Health Organization initiated the Global Smallpox Eradication Program in 1967, and approached Wyeth to develop a better injection system for smallpox vaccines which could be used in the field. Wyeth waived patent royalties on its innovative bifurcated needle, aiding in the delivery of over 200 million smallpox vaccines per year.

=== 1970–1989 ===
Wyeth's oral contraceptives became popular in the US. John W. Culligan, after becoming chairman and CEO in 1981, spun off less profitable lines and focused resources on consumer and prescription drugs. Wyeth made history in 1984 with the introduction of Advil, the first nonprescription ibuprofen in America, as well as the most famous prescription-to-OTC switch in history.

John R. Stafford became CEO and chairman in 1986. He completed the divestiture of non-core businesses such as household products, foods, candy (Brach's), and medical devices (e.g., its Sherwood-Medical Company was sold to Tyco-Kendal in 1997). Wyeth and Ayerst merged to form Wyeth-Ayerst Laboratories, thus strengthening and consolidating Wyeth's pharmaceutical operations.

In the late 1980s, Wyeth acquired the animal health businesses of Bristol-Myers and Parke-Davis. Wyeth also acquired A.H. Robins, makers of Robitussin, ChapStick, Dimetapp, and the Dalkon Shield merging it into its Whitehall unit to establish its Whitehall-Robins Division.

=== 1990–1999 ===
In 1990, Reckitt & Colman (now Reckitt Benckiser) acquired Boyle-Midway from American Home Products. After a dedication of the food business, the PAM trademark became part of American Home Foods.

In 1993, Premarin became the most prescribed drug in the US. Effexor (venlafaxine HCl), the first serotonin–norepinephrine reuptake inhibitor (SNRI), is introduced for the treatment of clinical depression and is later indicated for generalized anxiety disorder and social anxiety disorder.

In 1993, Wyeth founded the Women's Health Research Institute, the only institute in the pharmaceutical industry entirely dedicated to research in women's health. The Institute conducted trials in menopausal issues, endometriosis, contraception, and more.

In 1994, Wyeth acquired American Cyanamid and its subsidiary Lederle Laboratories. This acquisition brought the Lederle Praxis vaccines, new research and development capacity, and Centrum, the leading US multivitamin. Wyeth's sales topped US$13 billion in 1995. Two years later, Premarin became the company's first brand to reach US$1 billion in sales.

In 1995, Wyeth acquired the animal health division of Solvay, which was folded into Fort Dodge Animal Health. The acquisition gave Fort Dodge Animal Health strong market presence in Europe and Asia as well as expanding its product portfolio to include swine and poultry vaccines.

In 1996, American Home Products spun off its food unit as International Home Foods. International Home Foods was purchased by ConAgra Foods in 2000. Wyeth also purchased full ownership of Genetics Institute, Inc. after acquiring a majority interest in 1992.

In 1997, the US Food and Drug Administration (FDA) requested that Wyeth withdraw its controversial diet drug fenfluramine from the market after several reports of deaths and other health problems associated with the drug combination known as fen-phen occurred.

In 1998, American Home Products was left at the altar by British pharma powerhouse SmithKline Beecham, who pulled the plug on the estimated $70 billion merger. The deal was reportedly killed in response to British regulators who feared losing jobs to a proposed US headquarters location. (SmithKline Beecham merged with fellow Brit Glaxo Wellcome in 1999 to form the world's leading drug company.) This was the start of a three-year losing streak in the mergers and acquisitions game for AHP.

In 1999, another American Home Products merger fell through, this time a proposed $34 billion merger-of-equals with chemical and biotech manufacturer Monsanto Company. Though the companies issued a combined statement saying the breakup was mutual "because (the deal) was not in the best interests of shareholders," rumors circulated that AHP had canceled the deal due to issues in the soon-to-be-combined boardroom. (Monsanto announced in December 1999 that it would merge with Pharmacia & Upjohn instead; the new conglomerate eventually unloaded Monsanto again, before being bought themselves by Pfizer in 2003.)

=== 2000–2009 ===
- In 2000, American Home Products lost a US$65 billion friendly takeover bid for rival drug company Warner-Lambert. After the merger announcement, Pfizer offered a competing hostile bid, primarily to save its joint venture with Warner over Lipitor (the #1 prescription drug in the world at the time). At one point, talks were under way in which Procter & Gamble would help by buying both companies in a wild three-way merger, a rumor which cost P&G a 10% drop in its stock price. Although both CEOs eventually toured the world to defend the deal to the company's shareholders, Pfizer won Warner-Lambert and formed the second largest drug company in the world, while AHP had to settle for a US$1.8 billion poison-pill payment. This was at the time the biggest poison-pill payment in US history.
- On May 17, 2000, the US Food and Drug Administration approved Gemtuzumab Ozogamicin (Mylotarg; Wyeth Laboratories, now part of Pfizer). The drug is a recombinant, humanized anti-CD33 monoclonal antibody (IgG4 κ antibody hP67.6) covalently attached to the cytotoxic antitumor antibiotic calicheamicin (N-acetyl-γ-calicheamicin) via a bifunctional linker (4-(4-acetylphenoxy)butanoic acid). Gemtuzumab ozogamicin was developed in a collaboration between Wyeth-Ayerst Research and Celltech Chiroscience, using Celltech's antibody-humanization technology and Wyeth-Ayerst's calicheamicin-conjugation technology. The drug was approved on May 17, 2000 under the FDA's Accelerated Approval regulations, and was indicated for the treatment of patients with CD33-positive Acute Myeloid Leukemia (AML) in first relapse who are 60 years of age or older and who are not considered candidates for cytotoxic chemotherapy. The approved dose was 9 mg/m i.v. over 4 h and repeated every 14 days. In 2010, after Pfizer acquired Wyeth Pharmaceuticals, gemtuzumab ozogamicin was voluntarily withdrawn from the market. In January 2017 Pfizer's Biologics License Application (BLA; BLA761060) for gemtuzumab ozogamicin was accepted for filing by the FDA. A marketing authorisation application for review by the European Medicines Agency was validated in December 2016 and on September 1, 2017, the FDA (re)approved gemtuzumab ozogamicin. The (re-)approval included a lower recommended dose, a different schedule in combination with chemotherapy or on its own, and a new patient population.
- On January 23, 2009, The Wall Street Journal reported that Pfizer was in talks to buy Wyeth at a cost of US$68 billion. On January 25, Pfizer agreed to the purchase, a deal financed with cash, shares and loans. The deal was completed on October 15, 2009. The purchase was approved by the SEC and went into effect later in 2009, although vestiges of Wyeth remained for another year or two while effects of the merger were ironed out.
- Robert Essner, the company's former CEO, was appointed in 2001. On September 27, 2007, the Wyeth Board of Directors elected Bernard Poussot President and Chief Executive Officer effective on January 1, 2008.
- On March 11, 2002, American Home Products changed its name to Wyeth, having spun off unrelated businesses in order to focus on pharmaceuticals.
- As part of the Women's Health Initiative sponsored by the National Institutes of Health, a large-scale clinical trial for hormone replacement therapy showed that long-term use of combined progestin plus estrogen may increase the risk of strokes, heart attacks, blood clots, and breast cancer. Following these results, Wyeth experienced a significant decline in its sales of Premarin (conjugated equine estrogens) and Prempro (combined progestin plus estrogen) The results from the study were significant enough that the National Heart, Lung, and Blood Institute (NHLBI) of the National Institutes of Health (NIH) terminated the trials early due to a fear that their participants might be at risk.
- Wyeth, as a corporation, filed a 'citizens complaint' with the United States FDA on October 16, 2005, requesting that the US FDA take action against pharmacies who compound, manufacture, or sell unlicensed bioidentical hormone replacement therapy (BHRT) drugs to their patients. Specifically, Wyeth asserted that the BHRT drugs are not licensed by the FDA according to section 505 of the Food, Drug and Cosmetic Act, misbranded and adulterated per sections 501 and 502 of 21 U.S.C. (paragraphs 351, 352, and 355). Drug manufacturers are required to demonstrate through clinical trials that marketed drugs are safe and efficacious, a process that BHRT drugs have not undergone. If honored, the request would require the same safety and efficacy data for those primarily engaged in alternative medicine.
- The European Commissioner for Health and Consumer Protection blamed the presence of illegal steroids in the food supply on "fraudulent exchange and disposal of pharmaceutical waste". A Wyeth factory disposing of the byproducts from synthetic progesterone manufacture was the source of the contamination.
- In 2003 Wyeth reportedly contributed funds to a not-for-profit support group, The Meningitis Centre, which lobbied the Australian Government to introduce universal immunisation against pneumococcal disease. Wyeth produced the only pneumococcal vaccine approved for young children in Australia.
- During June 2009, an Arkansas federal judge granted public access to evidence that Wyeth Pharmaceuticals "ghostwrote" medical articles regarding its hormone therapy drug Prempro. Along with The New York Times, PLoS Medicine, represented by the law firm Public Justice, had sought to intervene in a court case of women bringing an action in relation to Prempro and other hormone therapy drugs, in order to unseal papers that allegedly showed that Wyeth failed to disclose its role in preparing medical journal articles promoting Prempro and in recruiting academic authors to put their names on the articles for publication—‌which is to say, they practised ghost writing.
- On October 15, 2009, Pfizer signed the final acquisition papers making Wyeth a wholly owned subsidiary of Pfizer, thus completing the US$68 billion dollar deal.

=== 2012–present ===
- In 2012, Nestlé bought the infant nutrition division of Pfizer and renamed it as Wyeth Nutrition. The Wyeth brand is still owned by Pfizer.

== Subsidiaries ==
=== Wyeth Consumer Healthcare ===
Wyeth Consumer Healthcare (formerly Whitehall-Robins Consumer Healthcare) operated throughout the world. The consumer healthcare division had sales of $2.5 billion in 2004 and was at the time the fifth largest over-the-counter health products company in the world.

=== Wyeth Pharmaceuticals ===
Wyeth Pharmaceuticals, formerly Wyeth-Ayerst Laboratories, is the original company founded by the Wyeth brothers, originally known as John Wyeth and Brother. They focused on the research, development, and marketing of prescription drugs. The pharmaceuticals division was further subdivided into five subdivisions: Wyeth Research, Prescription Products, Biotech, Vaccines, and Nutritionals.

=== Fort Dodge Animal Health ===
Fort Dodge Animal Health was founded in 1912 by Daniel E. Baughman as "Fort Dodge Serum Company". The company was established in Fort Dodge, Iowa, to manufacture hog cholera serum. It became a division of American Home Products in 1945. It is a leading manufacturer of prescription and over-the-counter veterinary vaccines and pharmaceuticals. Its global headquarters are located in Overland Park, Kansas.

Innovative Fort Dodge products include West Nile-Innovator, Duramune Adult, CYDECTIN Pour-on, the Pyramid vaccine line, Quest Gel, and EtoGesic Tablets.

== Products ==
=== Wyeth Consumer Healthcare Products (changed to Pfizer Consumer Healthcare, GSK Consumer Healthcare, and finally Haleon) ===
- Advil
- Advil Allergy Sinus Caplets
- Advil Allergy & Congestion Relief Tablets
- Advil Caplets
- Advil Cold & Sinus Caplets
- Advil Cold & Sinus Liqui-Gels
- Advil Congestion Relief
- Advil Gelcaps
- Advil Liqui-Gels
- Advil PM Caplets
- Advil PM Liqui-Gels
- Advil Sodium Ibuprofen (Fast-Acting)
- Alavert
- Anadin
- Anbesol
- Caltrate
- Centrum Advance
- Centrum Kids
- Centrum Silver/Select Advance
- ChapStick
- Clusivol OB
- Clusivol Plus
- Clusivol Power-C (defunct)
- Children's Clusivol
- Dimetapp
- Dristan
- Fibrosine
- Incremin
- Loviscol
- Polymagma
- Preparation H
- Robitussin
- Robitussin DM
- Robitussin Liquigel
- Robikids
- Robitol (now defunct)
- Simeco
- Stresstabs
- Today condoms
- Z-bec

=== Wyeth Pharmaceuticals Products ===
- Ativan (lorazepam): a benzodiazepine used to treat anxiety, insomnia, and certain seizures
- Effexor/Effexor XR (venlafaxine HCl): an SNRI for clinical depression, generalized anxiety disorder, and social anxiety disorder
- Enbrel (etanercept): a drug approved for Psoriasis and various forms of Rheumatoid Arthritis (co-marketed by Amgen)
- Lybrel: A breakthrough birth control medication that went on the market in 2008, Wyeth put more into the advertising of this drug than any other medicine previously.
- Premarin: (conjugated estrogen tablets); Estrogen HRT for menopausal women
- Premarin Vaginal Cream: (conjugated estrogens) indicated to treat vaginal dryness at menopause
- Prevnar: vaccine to protect children from pneumococcal disease
- Pristiq (desvenlafaxine): a newly approved antidepressant for the treatment of major depressive disorder (MDD)
- Protonix (pantoprazole): a proton pump inhibitor for treating dyspepsia, duodenal ulcers and oesophagitis
- Relistor (methylnaltrexone): a newly approved drug for constipation induced by opioids (co-marketed with Progenics)
- Surmontil (trimipramine): a tetracyclic antidepressant and the only psychotropic drug that shows no effect on REM sleep.
- Torisel (temsirolimus): a drug approved for the treatment of Renal Cell Carcinoma (a type of cancer).
- Tygacil (tigecycline): an antibiotic developed for treatment of intra-abdominal and skin / tissue infections caused by resistant pathogens such as MRSA
- Xyntha (Antihemophilic Factor (Recombinant), Plasma/Albumin-Free): a new form of AHF, recently approved by the US FDA
- Zosyn (piperacillin/tazobactam): another intravenous antibiotic used mainly in intensive care medicine. Also known as Tazocin in some countries.

=== Fort Dodge Animal Health Products ===
- Barricade
- Biodectin Sheep Vaccine and wormer (moxidectin)
- Bursine-2/Bursine Plus/Bursine K Poultry Vaccines
- Cefa-Lak/Cefa-Dri
- CYDECTIN (moxidectin)
- Dicural
- Duramune Dog Vaccines
- Duvaxyn Horse Vaccines
- EtoGesic Tablets
- Ewegaurd Sheep Vaccine and wormer (moxidectin)
- Fel-O-Guard Cat Vaccines
- Fel-O-Vax Cat Vaccines
- Fluvac Innovator Horse Vaccine
- GiardiaVax Dog Vaccine
- Ketaset
- LeptoVax Dog Vaccine
- LymeVax Dog Vaccine
- Nolvasan
- PestVac Pig Vaccine
- Pinnacle I.N. Horse Vaccine
- Pneumobort Horse Vaccine
- Polyflex
- Poulvac Poultry Vaccines
- Presponse Cattle Vaccines
- ProHeart 6/ProHeart SR-12 (moxidectin) Heartworm preventative
- ProMeris for dogs and cats
- Provac Poultry Vaccines
- PYRAMID Cattle Vaccines
- Quest/Equest Gel (moxidectin)
- Rabon Ear Tags for Cattle
- Rabvac Rabies Vaccine for Dogs
- Supona
- Suvaxyn Pig Vaccines
- Synanthic
- SYNOVEX Implants
- Telazol
- ToDAY/ToMORROW
- Torbugesic-SA
- Triangle Cattle Vaccines
- TriReo Poultry Vaccine
- Vetdectin (moxidectin) (New Zealand)
- Weanerguard Sheep Vaccine and wormer (moxidectin)
- Websters Cattle, Sheep and Poultry Vaccines (Australia)
- West Nile Innovator Horse Vaccine

=== Wyeth Nutrition Products ===
Prenatal

- Bonina

Infant and Follow-on

- S-26
- S-26 Gold
- Bonna
- Bonna Follow-up Formula (Formerly Bonamil)

Toddler

- Bonakid (Formerly Bonakid 1+)
- S-26 Promil Gold (Formerly Progress Gold)
- S-26 Promil (Formerly Progress & Promil Kid)
- Ascenda

Pre-school

- Bonakid Pre-School
- Promil (Formerly Promil Pre-School)
- Promil Gold (Formerly Progress Pre-School Gold)
- Ascenda Kid

Special Feeder

- S-26 Gold Comfortis HW
- S-26 Gold CS
- S-26 Gold HA
- S-26 Gold LF
- Bonna Low Lactose

Former Milk Products

- ProMama (Philippines)
- Enercal Plus (Philippines)
- Aqiva (Now Ascenda Kid)
- Promil Aqiva (Now Ascenda)
- Nursoy
- S-26 Soy Gold
- S-26 Lactose Free
- Promil Lactose Free
- S-26 LF Gold
- Promil LF Gold
- Promil Kid
- Bonamil
- Bonakid School Age Choco Boost (Philippines)
- S-26 Organic
- S-26 Promil Organic
- Progress
- Progress Gold
- Promil Pre-School
- Progress Pre-School Gold
- Bonakid 1+
- Bonakid Pre-School 3+
- Promil Gold
- Promil Organic

== Controversies ==
=== Rapamune ===
A "whistleblower suit" was filed against Wyeth in 2005 alleging that the company illegally marketed their drug Rapamune. Wyeth is targeted in the suit for off-label marketing, targeting specific doctors and medical facilities to increased sales of Rapamune, trying to get current transplant patients to change from their current transplant drugs to Rapamune and for specifically targeting African-Americans. According to the whistleblowers, Wyeth also provided doctors and hospitals with kickbacks to prescribe the drug in the form of grants, donations and other money. As of 2010, a US House of Representatives committee, led by Rep. Edolphus Towns was investigating Wyeth for these abuses.

=== Prempro ===
Wyeth was sued for its marketing of Prempro, a hormone replacement therapy, which was implicated in the cancers of 14,000 patients. Wyeth was particularly criticised by observers for its use of 'ghostwriters' to put their names to research papers that Wyeth had paid a third party, DesignWrite, to prepare.

=== Diet-Drug: Dexfenfluramine (Phentermine/Fenfluramine, aka,"Fen-Phen") ===
The drug combination fenfluramine/phentermine, usually called "fen-phen", was an anti-obesity treatment. Fenfluramine was marketed by Wyeth as Pondimin, but was shown to cause potentially fatal pulmonary hypertension and heart valve problems.
