= Caltrate =

Brand name calcium supplement

Caltrate is a brand name calcium supplement sold by Haleon.

The brand was originally owned by Pfizer (formerly Wyeth) and GSK and in Japan by Hisamitsu Pharmaceutical.

The Caltrate brand is supplied in many different formulas; calcium carbonate (NOT calcium citrate) is the common ingredient serving as the calcium supplement source. Caltrate contains 600 mg of calcium carbonate as opposed to 200 mg in a typical multivitamin product. Caltrate Plus also contains 800 IU of vitamin D (cholecalciferol), 20 mcg vitamin K1, 50 mg magnesium, 7.5 mg zinc oxide, 1 mg copper, and 1.8 mg of manganese (II) sulfate monohydrate.
