= Haleon =

British multinational consumer healthcare company

Haleon plc

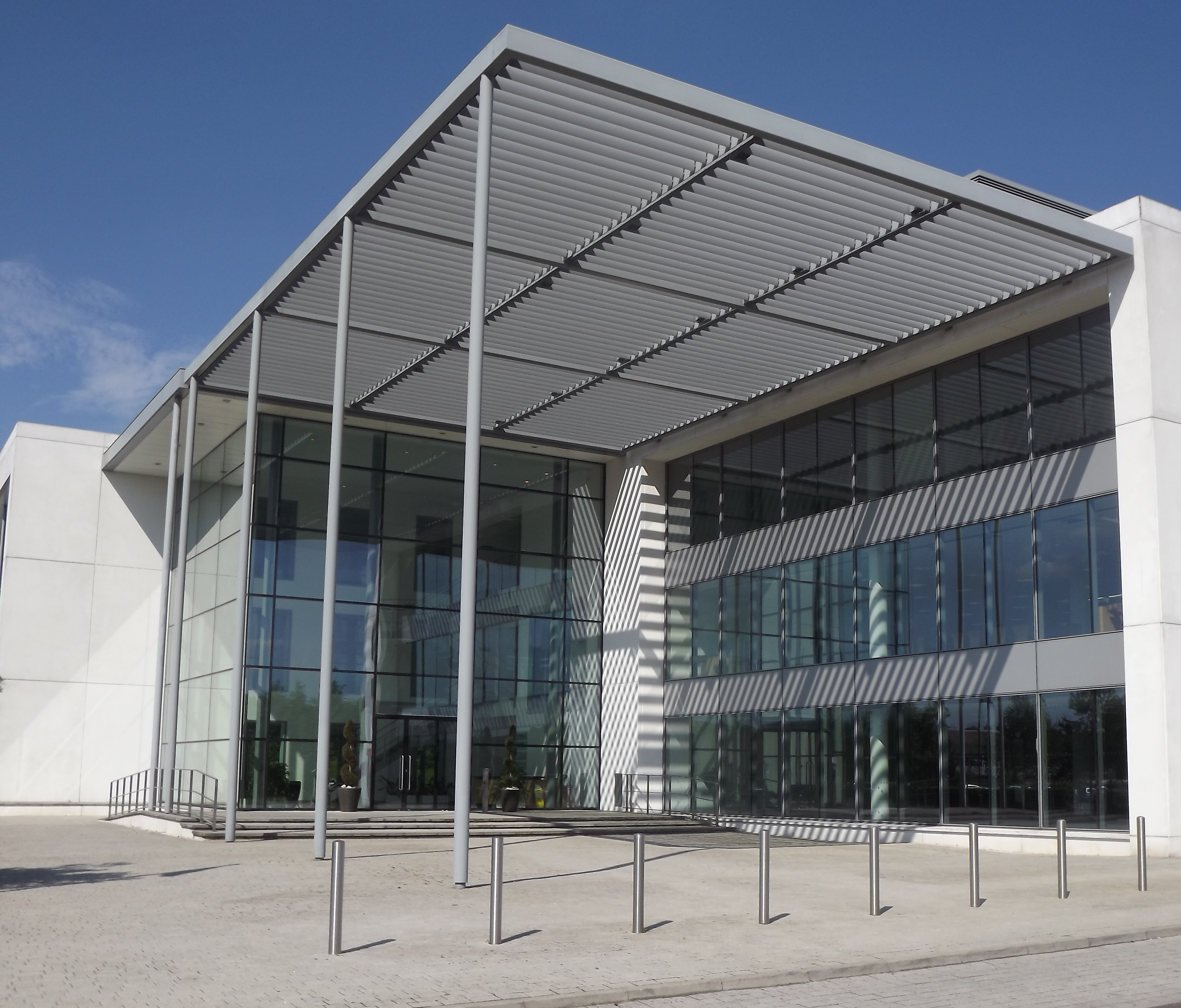
- Headquarters in Weybridge, UK
- Type: Public limited company
- Traded as: LSE: HLN; NYSE: HLN; FTSE 100 component
- ISIN: GB00BMX86B70
- Industry: Healthcare; Consumer goods
- Predecessors: GSK Consumer Healthcare (SmithKline Beecham Consumer Healthcare; Sterling Winthrop Consumer Healthcare International; Norcliff Thayer; Marion Merrell Dow Consumer Healthcare; Novartis Consumer Healthcare; Bristol-Myers Squibb Consumer Healthcare North America; AstraZeneca Consumer Healthcare; Glaxo Wellcome Consumer Healthcare (Note: In 1993, Warner Lambert and Wellcome created a joint venture with both companies merging their OTC products into a joint venture, the Wellcome OTC brands such as Calpol and Actifed; Glaxo also made a agreement with Warner Lambert in 1994 for the distribution of Zantac. In 1995, Glaxo and Wellcome merged to form Glaxo Wellcome which saw its OTC joint venture with Warner Lambert to now include Calpol, Actifed, and Zantac. In 1996, Warner Lambert bought out Glaxo Wellcome's stake in the joint venture, this caused Calpol, Actifed, and Zantac to be owned by Warner Lambert in most countries, however Glaxo Wellcome retained their OTC division in select countries such as the Philippines, Indonesia and South Africa. In 2000, Glaxo Wellcome and SmithKline Beecham merged to form GSK, in some countries where Glaxo Wellcome retained their OTC division, the remaining OTC division of Glaxo Wellcome also merged with SmithKline Beecham's OTC.); Block Drug; Stiefel Laboratories); Pfizer Consumer Healthcare (Note: Pfizer had previously sold its consumer health division (which had included in its portfolio such brands as Listerine, Benadryl, Visine, Combantrin, Mylanta, Nicorette, Sudafed, Rogaine, Rolaids, and Zantac) to Johnson & Johnson in 2006, but re-entered the consumer health industry when it acquired Wyeth (whose consumer health division had included in its portfolio such brands as Advil, Centrum, ChapStick, Dimetapp, and Robitussin) in 2009. It later sold its consumer health division again to GSK plc.) (Wyeth Consumer Healthcare; Ferrosan Consumer Healthcare)
- Founded: 18 July 2022; 4 years ago
- Headquarters: Weybridge, England, United Kingdom
- Area served: Worldwide
- Key people: Manvinder Singh Banga (chairman); Brian McNamara (CEO)
- Products: Oral hygiene and medicines; nutritional products; over-the-counter medicines
- Brands: Actifed; Advil; Aquafresh; Beechams; Biotene; Caltrate; Centrum; Contac; Emergen-C; Eno; Excedrin; Fenbid; Fenistil; Flonase; Foodles; Loviscol; Maclean; Nexium; Nicorette; Nicotinell; Odol; Otrivin; Panadol; Parodontax; Polident; Sensodyne; Theraflu; Tums; Voltaren
- Revenue: ▼£11,030 million (2025)
- Operating income: ▲£2,412 million (2025)
- Net income: ▲£1,680 million (2025)
- Total assets: ▼£32,630 million (2025)
- Total equity: ▲£16,484 million (2025)
- Number of employees: 24,000 (2024)
- Subsidiaries: Haleon Pakistan
- Website: www.haleon.com

Haleon plc is a British multinational consumer healthcare company with headquarters in Weybridge, England. It is one of the largest consumer healthcare businesses in the world, with brands including Sensodyne toothpaste, Panadol and Advil painkillers, and Centrum vitamins. The company was projected to be a global leader in over the counter medicines with a 7.3 per cent market share in 2022.

Haleon was established on 18 July 2022 as a corporate spin-off from GSK. Haleon is listed on the London Stock Exchange and is a component of the FTSE 100, with a secondary listing on the New York Stock Exchange.

== History ==
GSK and Pfizer merged their consumer healthcare businesses in 2019. GSK owned just over two thirds of the joint venture, and Pfizer owned the remainder. Annual sales were around £10 billion across 120 markets in 2020. GSK then announced plans to spin off Haleon in 2022 to give the "tired drugmaker extra focus and firepower by gearing up and hiving off the consumer division," according to Reuters. Unilever offered £50 billion for the business in 2022, which GSK rejected. Nestlé examined the possibility of a bid in conjunction with Reckitt. In October 2023, GSK reduced its ownership in Haleon to 7.4%, and in January 2024 it further reduced its ownership to 4.2%.

In August 2023, Haleon sold its Lamisil antifungal brand to Karo Healthcare AB for £235 million, and in February 2024, Haleon sold its ChapStick lip care brand to Yellow Wood Partners for £401 million.

In March 2024, Pfizer reduced its share in Haleon from 32% to 24% per cent by selling 630 million shares in a public offering.

Further sales followed: in April 2024, Haleon announced that it would close its Sensodyne toothpaste factory in Maidenhead, moving that manufacturing to Slovakia, and it outsourced mouthwash manufacturing to an unrelated company and, in September 2024, the company completed the sale of its non-US nicotine replacement therapy business to Dr. Reddy's Laboratories in a deal worth £458 million.

In March 2025, Pfizer sold its entire stake in Haleon for £2.5 billion ($3.24 billion), exiting the consumer healthcare business it helped create by its 2019 joint venture with GSK.

== Operations ==
Oral health accounted for 28.5 percent of revenue in 2021.

Sir Dave Lewis is chairman, with Brian McNamara as chief executive.

== Brands ==
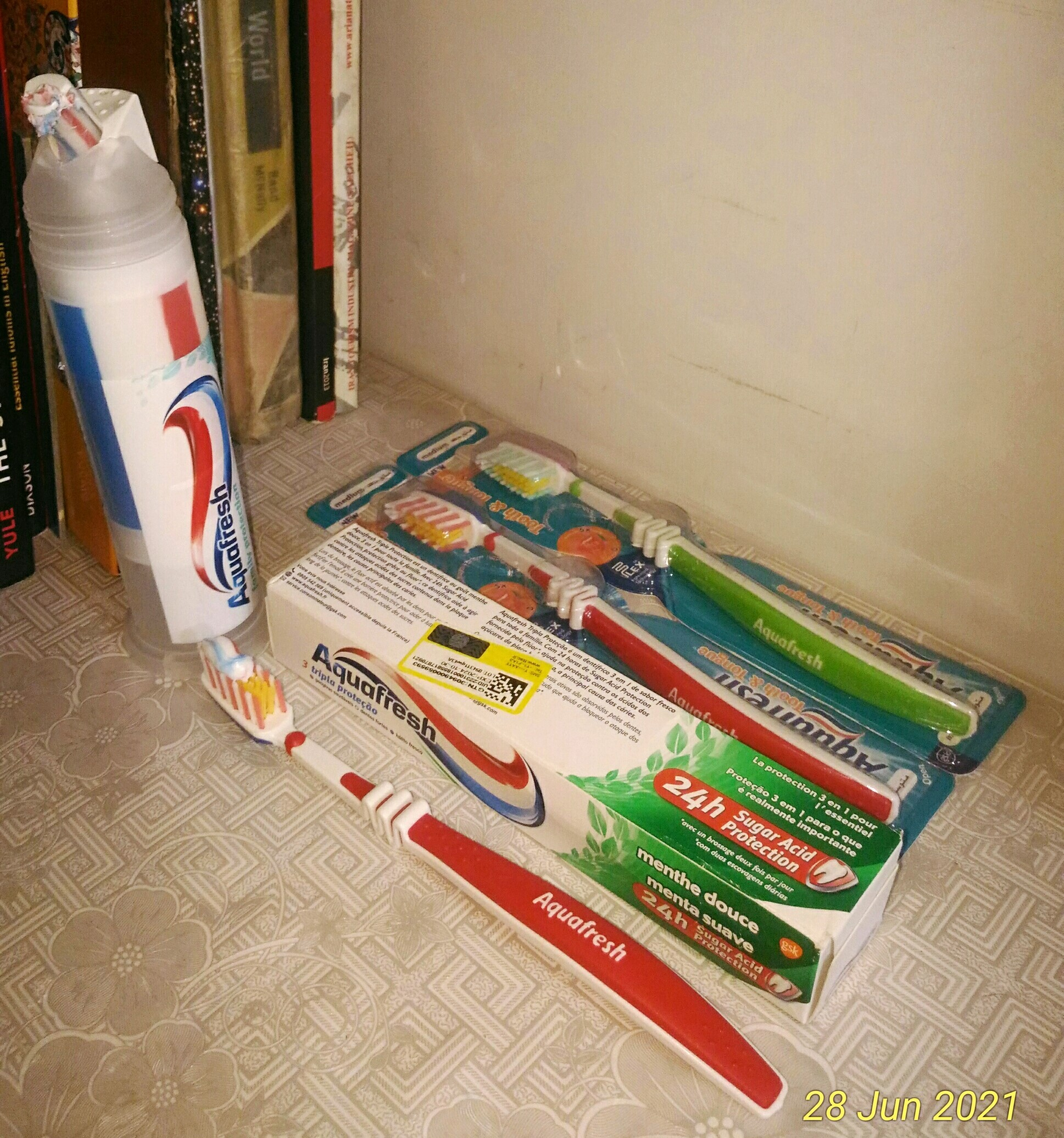
A selection of Aquafresh toothpaste and toothbrushes produced by Haleon

=== Current ===
Brands include:

- Abreva (Docosanol)
- Actifed
- Advil (Ibuprofen)
- alli (Orlistat)
- Alinamin
- Anadin (pain relief)
- Aquafresh (oral healthcare)
- Astring-o-Sol (oral healthcare)
- Bactroban
- Be-Total (leader in vitamins market in Italy)
- Beconase
- Beechams Cold & Flu and Night/Day Nurse (cold and flu treatments)
- Benefiber
- Biotene (oral healthcare)
- Breathe Right (respiratory)
- Buckley's (Cold and Cough Medicine)
- Calpol (fever medicine)
- Caltrate (bone and joint supplement)
- Calvive
- Cataflam/Voltfast
- Centrum (vitamins and naturals)
- Cetebe (vitamins and naturals)
- Chlorhexamed (oral healthcare)
- Cholinex (analgesics and respiratory tract)
- Citrucel (gastrointestinal)
- Clusivol (multivitamins)
  - Clusivol Plus (mutivitamins)
  - Clusivol OB (multivitamins for pregnant and lactating women)
  - Children's Clusivol (multivitamins for children)
- Coldrex (cold and flu treatment)
- Commit Lozenge (smoking cessation)
- Committed Quitters (nicotine replacement)
- Corega (oral healthcare)
- Corsodyl (oral healthcare)
- Crocin (analgesics and respiratory tract)
- Dr. Best (oral healthcare)
- Emergen-C
- ENO (gastrointestinal)
- Eroxon
- Eumovate (dermatological)
- Excedrin
- Ex-Lax Stool Softener
- Fenistil
- Fenbid (analgesics and respiratory tract)
- Fibrosine (constipation relief)
- Flonase (fluticasone propionate)
- Foodles (noodles), origin: India
- Formigran (analgesic/triptan)
- Gas X
- Gaviscon
- Grand-PA (headache/toothache/pain and fever)
- Hinds (dermatological)
- Imedeen
- Iodex (pain relief)
- Iodosan (cold and flu treatment)
- Jack & Jill (Children's Cold and Cough Medicine)
- Junior Horlicks (nutritional)
- Lipactin
- Loviscol (cough suppressant)
- Macleans (oral healthcare)
- Maltova (nutritional)
- Maxinutrition (nutritional)
- Med-Lemon (hot, cold and flu medication)
- Medacalm (vitamins and naturals)
- Neocitran
- Nexium Control (esomeprazole)
- Nicorette (nicotine replacement)
- Night Nurse (cold and flu remedy)
- NiQuitin CQ/ Nicoderm CQ/ Nicabate (nicotine replacement)
- Nix (Only Scabies Treatment and only in Canada)
- Odol (oral healthcare)
- Odol-med3 (oral healthcare)
- Os-cal (vitamins and minerals)
- Otrivin/Otrivine (xylometazoline)
- Ostocalcium
- Panadeine (analgesics and respiratory tract)
- Panadol/Panodil (analgesics and respiratory tract)
- Parodontax (oral healthcare)
- Piriton/Piriteze/Pirinase (anti-allergy)
- Polident (oral healthcare)
- Poligrip (oral healthcare)
- Poligrip Ultra (oral healthcare)
- Preparation H
- Rhinadvil
- Robax (Pain relief and Muscle relaxant)
- Robikids (kids’ cough medicine)
- Robitussin (respiratory medicine)
- Rutinoscorbin (vitamins and naturals)
- Scott's (vitamins and naturals)
- Scott's Emulsion
- Sensodyne (oral healthcare)
  - Sensodyne Pronamel/Pronamel
- Shumitect (oral healthcare)
- Simeco (gastrointestinal)
- Sinecod (cough medicine)
- Solpadeine (analgesics and respiratory tract)
- Solpaflex
- Spectro ()
- Stresstabs (stress reliever)
- Super Poligrip (oral healthcare)
- Super Wernet's (oral healthcare)
- Synthol (oral healthcare)
- Theraflu (Respiratory)
- Thrive (Nicotine Replacement)
- TriHEMIC (anemia medicine)
- Tums (gastrointestinal)
- Viva (vitamins and naturals), origin: Nepal
- Voltaren/Voltarol (anti inflammatory)
- Zovirax (dermatological)

=== Divested ===
- ChapStick (sold to Suave Brands Company in 2024)
- Lamisil (terbinafine) (sold to Karo Healthcare in 2023)
- Nicotinell (sold to Dr Reddy's Laboratories in 2024)
