= Emergen-C =

Effervescent drink and vitamin supplement

- Product type: Effervescent; Vitamin supplement
- Current owner: Haleon
- Country: United States
- Introduced: 1978; 48 years ago
- Previous owners: Alacer Corp. Pfizer; GSK plc
- Tagline: "Emerge Your Best"
- Website: emergenc.com

Emergen-C is an effervescent, powdered drink mix vitamin supplement manufactured by Alacer Corp. The Emergen-C product line was introduced in 1978. Alacer was established as a private company in 1972, focusing on vitamin supplements containing vitamin C. Good was acquired by Pfizer in 2012. In 2019, Pfizer consumer healthcare entered a joint venture with GSK. The brand has been owned by Haleon since 18 July, 2022.

It contains, depending on the variety, 16 times the vitamin C, 4 times the vitamin B_{12}, and 5 times the vitamin B_{6} of the USDA Reference Daily Intake based on a 2000-calorie diet. Some versions include calcium, glucosamine, quercetin, or lycopene.

== Manufacturing ==
Pharmaceutical firm GlaxoSmithKline (GSK) moved forward on plans to close its manufacturing plant in Carlisle, Pennsylvania by mid-2021, several regional news organizations reported in 2012. Production of Emergen-C powdered vitamin C supplement drink mix products at the site was to be shifted to a facility in Puerto Rico.

== Ingredients ==
GMO ingredients are used. The Alacer website states: "We have chosen to source non-GMO materials whenever possible. That being said, we cannot guarantee that all of our raw materials are sourced from non-GMO ingredients and do not currently have this requirement in place for our vendors". Most products do not contain animal-derived ingredients, but certain products contain chondroitin from cows, honey, and vitamin D_{3} from wool.

== Emergen-C class-action lawsuit ==
In December 2013, a superior court judge preliminarily approved a $6.45 million settlement to a class action filed against Alacer Corp. for allegedly deceptively marketing the supplement Emergen-C. The complaint, which was filed earlier in the year, alleges that the company misleadingly represents that the supplement provides health benefits, including reducing the risk of or preventing colds and flu, without scientific evidence to support such claims. According to the settlement terms, class members may receive a refund of up to $36 with proof of purchase. (Wong et al v. Alacer Corp, Case No. CGC-12-519221, Superior Court of California, County of San Francisco.) A superior court judge gave final approval of the settlement to this lawsuit in June 2014.

== Charitable activities ==
In 1997, Alacer established the Emergen-C Fund, which has raised more than $650,000. This fund provides support to Vitamin Angels, Surfrider Foundation, Keep A Breast Foundation, Young Survival Coalition, and Whole Foods' Whole Planet Foundation.

Alacer sponsors Operation Gratitude, a volunteer organization that has sent care packages to U.S. troops in Iraq and Afghanistan.

In 2008, Emergen-C teamed up with surf artist Jay Alders to create art for the packaging of their new product/flavor, Emergen-C Blue, with 25 cents donated to Surfrider Foundation for each box sold.

== See also ==
- Airborne (dietary supplement)
- Berocca
- Vitamin C megadosage
