= Macleans (toothpaste) =

Dental hygiene product

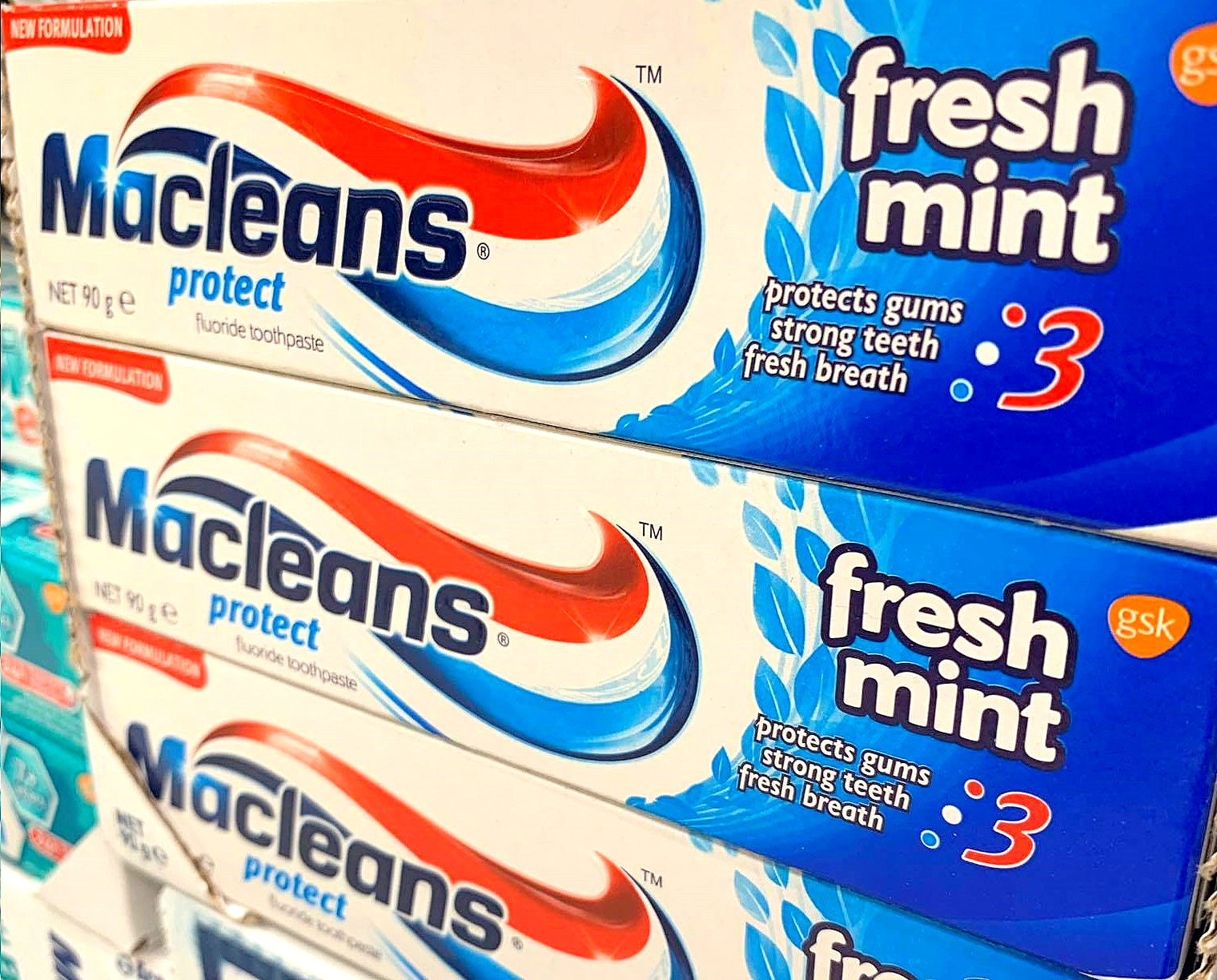
- Packets in an Australian supermarket with the three-striped (red, white and blue) logo
- Product type: Oral hygiene
- Current owner: Haleon
- Country: United Kingdom
- Introduced: 1919; 107 years ago
- Tagline: Did you Maclean your teeth today Daisy? (ca. 1938)

Macleans is a brand of toothpaste manufactured by Haleon. Maclean's used to be produced by the British multinational company GlaxoSmithKline and is one of the oldest GSK brands produced.

== History ==
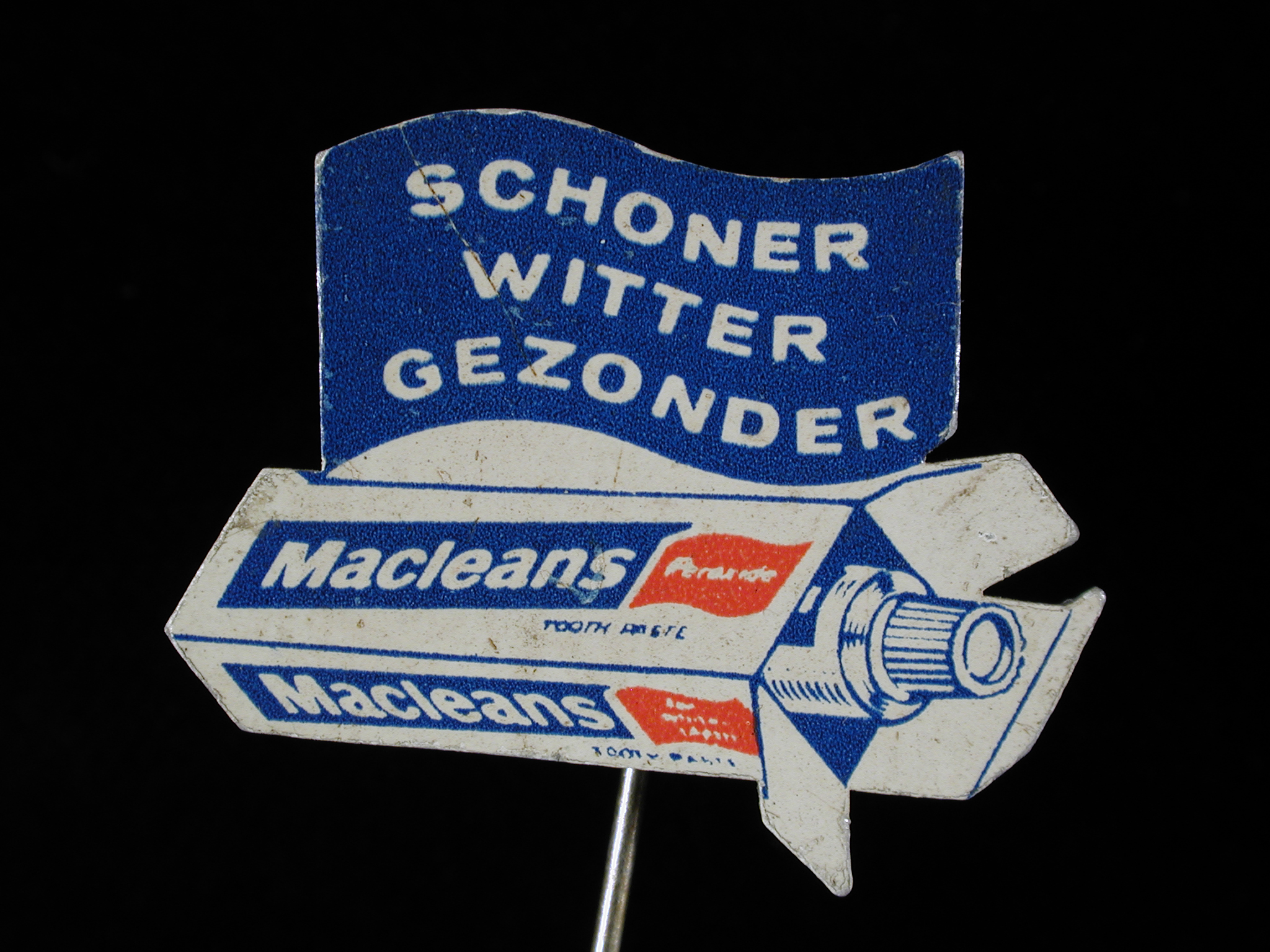
Macleans Peroxide, circa 1960

Macleans was introduced by New Zealand-born businessman Alexander Campbell Maclean in 1919 during the post-First World War era of consumerism in Great Britain under the family business name of Macleans Limited and Beecham (now GlaxoSmithKline), whose roots originate to the 19th century.

Maclean moved to Australia after the gold rush, then moved to the United States in the early 1920s to become a corset salesman, before launching his own brand for chemists, where he invented a tube printing operation that allowed different chemists' names to be printed on own name toothpastes in small batches.

In 1923, Maclean hired a flight chemist Walter McGeorge who helped the company developed a range of merchandise and set the foundation for Macleans' transition into scientific medicine. In 1927, Macleans Peroxide Toothpaste, a pink formula, was one of the first whitening products introduced to the British oral care market, which proved to be extremely popular among consumerists, where a white variety was later launched.

=== Popularity ===
The Macleans company scored a major takeover after Woolworths stocked it in the early 1930s (as the company only sold Colgate toothpaste previously). In 1938, Macleans was purchased by Beecham Group. In 1987, GlaxoSmithKline introduced an antibacterial agent into the Macleans toothpaste, being the first to do so. In 1995, the brand launched a Whitening variety, the first mainstream toothpaste to whiten teeth. The brand was also the first to introduce bicarbonate of soda in its toothpaste products. In 1997, the brand launched a Macleans toothbrush, which has over 1800 bristles. Macleans has over 40 years of heritage in Nigeria.

== Products ==
Containing fluoride, Macleans toothpaste is available in various types: Fresh Mint, White & Shine and Whitening. There are also other variants such as Macleans Whitening, Macleans Ice Whitening Gel and Milk Teeth (for children). The 'white' varieties feature whitening microparticles that break up stains. Natural ingredients in the product include, eucalyptus, sage, and peppermint oil, with antibacterial and antiseptic cleansing agents. Maclean's earliest cleaning materials used in their products were crushed bone, egg shell and crushed oyster shell. Charles III had used and promoted the 'Fresh Mint' variety.

Aquafresh, a toothpaste product with the same logo, was introduced in the US and the UK in 1979 by GlaxoSmithKline.

== See also ==
- List of toothpaste brands
