= Imedeen =

Beauty supplements company

Imedeen is a beauty supplements company that sells nutricosmetics. It was developed in the 1980s by the Swedish biochemist Ake Dahlgren. The brand is owned by Haleon (previously by GlaxoSmithKline) and headquartered in Brentford, Hounslow a suburb in the United Kingdom.

== Products ==
Imedeen supplements are manufactured by Ferrosan, a Danish healthcare company. In 2011, Pfizer entered into a definitive agreement to acquire Ferrosan's consumer healthcare business from Altor 2003 Fund GP Limited which includes dietary supplements and the Imedeen skincare range. The BioMarine Complex in all US Imedeen tablets is a proprietary blend of fish proteins and polysaccharides. It has been studied on its own (in-vitro) and as part of IMEDEEN formulations in clinical studies. Because it has not been studied on its own in clinical studies, it is impossible to know whether it does really benefit the skin, and because the formula is proprietary, it is impossible to know the optimal dose.

By May 2007, Imedeen was represented in over 70 countries. In 2017, model Christy Turlington Burns became an ambassador for the company.
