= Tums =

Brand of antacid medications

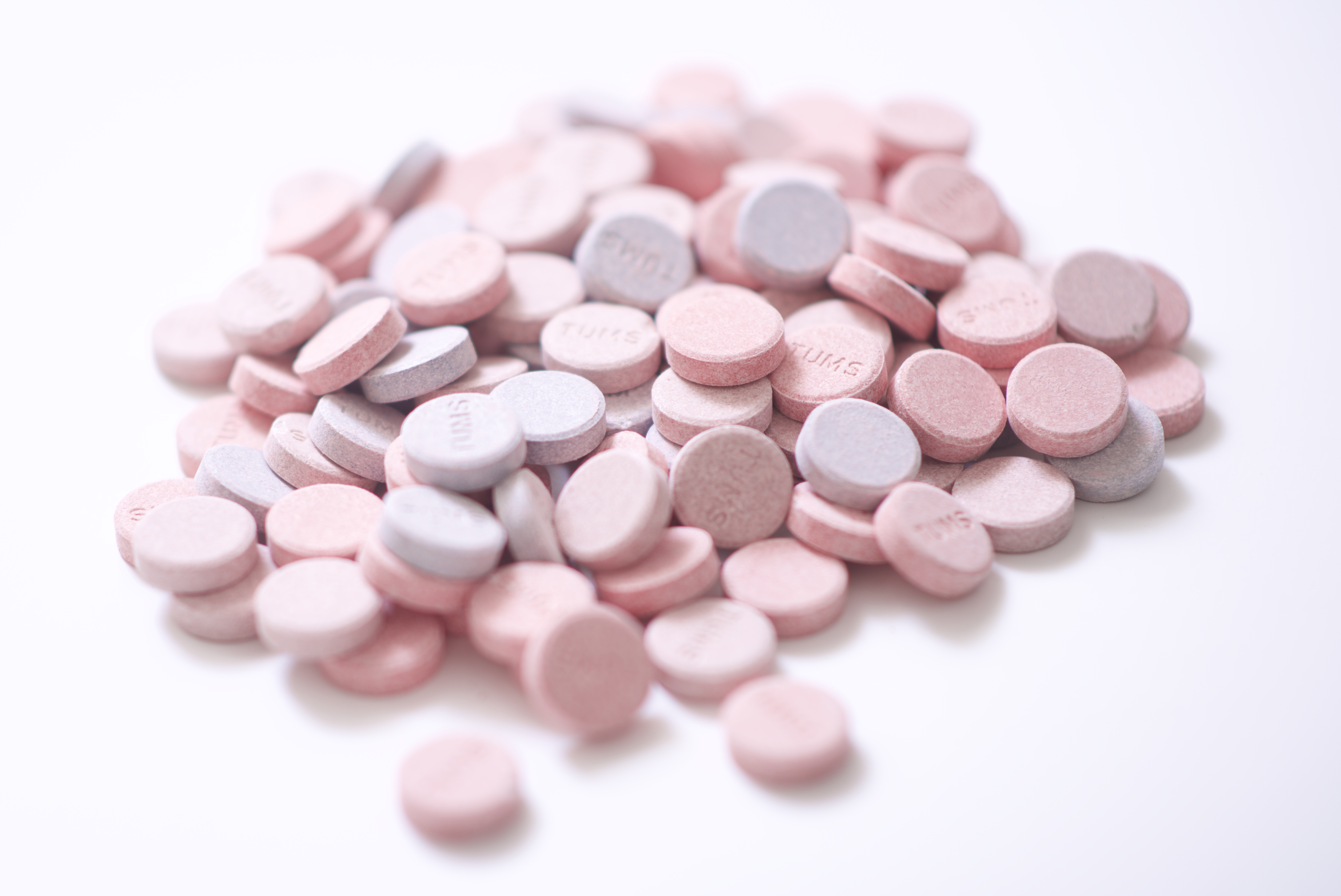
- Product type: Antacid
- Current owner: Haleon
- Country: United States
- Introduced: 1930; 96 years ago
- Previous owners: Lewis-Howe Company; Norcliff Thayer (Revlon); Beecham Group; SmithKline Beecham; GSK
- Website: www.tums.com

Tums (stylized as TUMS) is a brand of antacid made of sucrose (table sugar) and calcium carbonate (CaCO_{3}) manufactured by Haleon in St. Louis, Missouri, US. They are also available in a sugar-free version. It is an over-the-counter drug, available at many retail stores, including drug stores, grocery stores and mass merchandisers. It provides relief from heartburn and indigestion ("sour stomach").

== History ==
In 1928, James Harvey "Jim" Howe (born 1873 College Corner, Ohio, and died 1960 Webster Groves, Missouri), a pharmacist in St. Louis, Missouri, developed Tums in the basement of his home while treating his wife's indigestion. The remedy caught on, and commercial production began in 1930 by the Lewis-Howe Company, which took its name from Howe and his uncle, A. H. Lewis, who was a pharmacist in Bolivar, Missouri; Howe worked in his uncle's drugstore as a teenager. Tums were named in 1930 after a radio contest, which was won by a nurse who came up with the phrase "Tums for the Tummy."

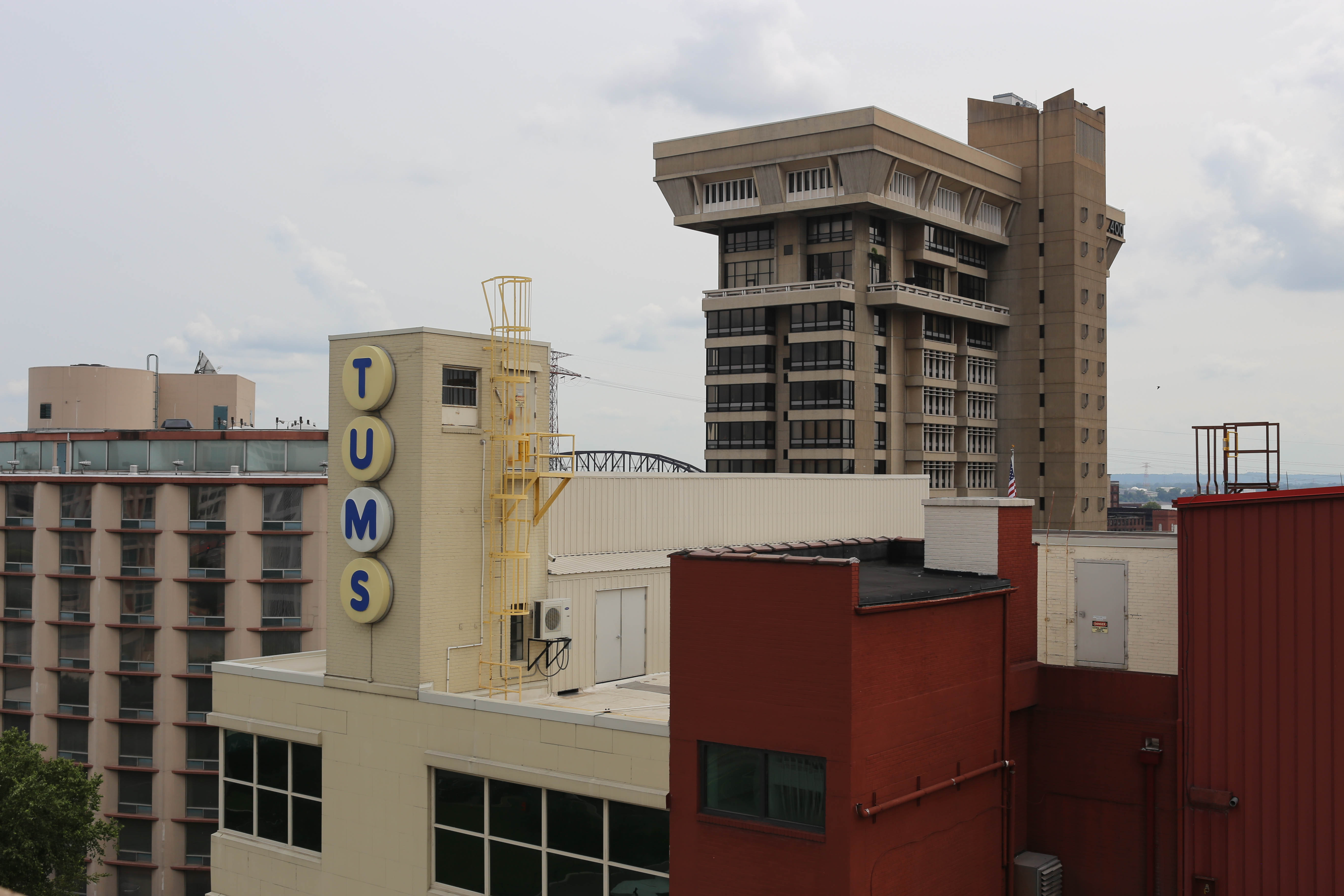
Tums plant in St. Louis (2018)

In 1978 the company was purchased by Revlon of New York, making it no longer a St. Louis–based company. Revlon's Norcliff Thayer unit oversaw the Tums brand. Revlon spun Norcliff Thayer off to the British Beecham Group in 1986, and Beecham eventually became GlaxoSmithKline through a series of mergers.

Since 1930, a plant originally built by Lewis-Howe in downtown St. Louis has been making the antacid tablets. The factory complex remains the main manufacturing site for Tums, and GlaxoSmithKline completed millions of dollars' worth of renovations and modernizations during the 2000s.

== Medical uses ==
Since Tums is an over-the-counter drug, it is not considered a pharmaceutical-grade treatment (and does not require a prescription). Prescription strength acid reflux medications often contain proton-pump inhibitor (PPI) or histamine H_{2} receptor blockers (H_{2} blockers, H_{2} antagonists).

== Advertising ==
Famous advertising campaigns for Tums have included "Tums for the Tummy" and, much later for television in the 1970s, "Mother Tums" ("There, there!"), and since 1981, a barbershop jingle sung to the theme music used in all versions of the TV crime drama series Dragnet.

== Varieties ==
Tums comes in chewable tablets that are taken orally. It is also available in different flavors such as peppermint and fruit flavors such as berry, orange, and cherry.
