= Actifed =

Brand of the cold and allergy symptoms medicines

Actifed is a registered trademark for a combination antihistamine and nasal decongestant medication used for cold and allergy symptoms. Actifed was developed in 1958 by Burroughs Wellcome & Company (now part of GlaxoSmithKline), later Haleon.

== 2006 U.S. formula change ==
The original formula for Actifed contained pseudoephedrine hydrochloride 60 mg as the nasal decongestant and triprolidine hydrochloride 2.5 mg as the antihistamine. However, in response to widespread laws requiring products containing pseudoephedrine to be kept behind the pharmacy counter, Pfizer changed Actifed's U.S. formula in late 2006 to contain phenylephrine HCl 10 mg as the nasal decongestant and chlorpheniramine maleate 4 mg as the antihistamine before the product was reacquired by GSK. Many users of the old formula have complained that the new formula is not as effective at relieving their symptoms. In 2023, a Food and Drug Administration panel concluded that phenylephrine was ineffective as a nasal decongestant when taken orally. Other brands available behind the counter that use the old formula include Genac and Aprodine. The American pharmacy chain Walgreens produced a house-brand version of Actifed, Wal-Act, which used the original pseudoephedrine/triprolidine formula. In 2021 Walgreens changed the name from Wal-Act to Cold & Allergy D; the pseudoephedrine/triprolidine formula remains the same.

In the UK, Germany, and Italy the formulation remained unchanged. The product is available over the counter as a pack of 12 tablets produced by McNeil. Each tablet contains Triprolidine hydrochloride 2.5 mg and Pseudoephedrine hydrochloride 60 mg. Since 2012, Actifed is no longer available in Thailand. Actifed as well as all drugs with pseudoephedrine are now strictly controlled under Thailand's narcotics control law so it was withdrawn from the market.

In Germany, the product is marketed under the registered trademark RhinoPRONT.

== Apollo missions ==
Actifed was included in the standard medical kit aboard the United States Apollo missions, and was used during Apollo 7 and Apollo 12 when crew members developed head cold symptoms. When Actifed was made available over the counter, former astronauts from the Apollo missions appeared in commercials promoting the product.
