= Berocca =

Effervescent drink and dietary supplement

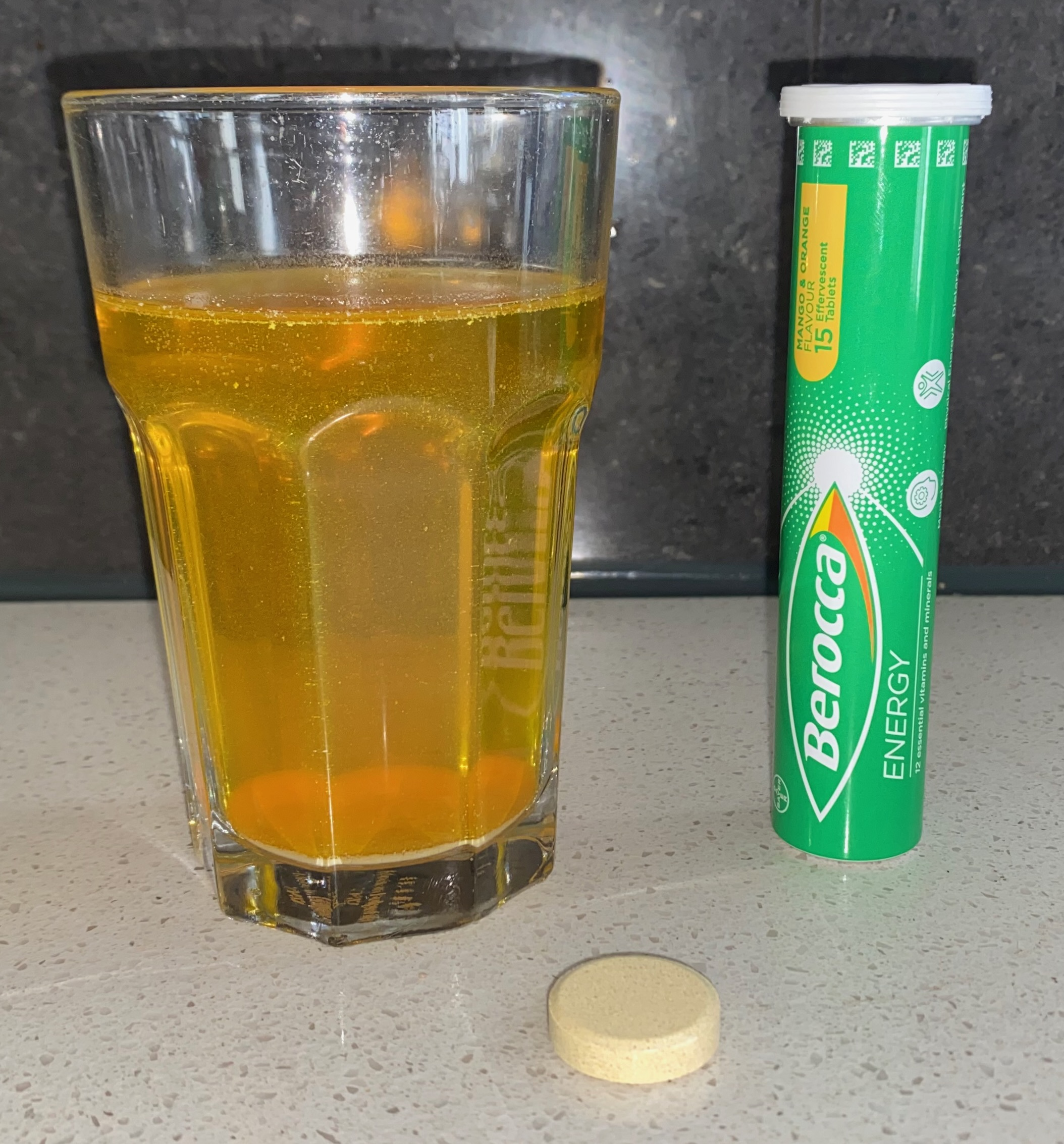
Berocca tablet and drink, Australian packaging

Berocca is a brand of effervescent drink and vitamin tablets containing B vitamins and vitamin C, manufactured by Bayer. Berocca was originally established in Switzerland in 1969 by Roche, and is available in a number of countries worldwide.

== Varieties ==
Berocca Performance is a formulation of B vitamins, vitamin C plus added magnesium, calcium and zinc. When first released in 1969, Berocca came in one flavour, Berry, which later became Original Berry. It now comes in four flavours: Original Berry, Orange, Blackcurrant, and Mango & Orange.

== Dosage and considerations ==
The recommended daily dose (age 12 upwards) is one tablet daily. Each tablet contains 260 mg of sodium. 273 mg of sodium is contained in the tablets sold in Australia and New Zealand.

Berocca causes urine to turn deep yellow in colour – this is due to the excess vitamin B_{2} (also known as Riboflavin, with "flavus" meaning "yellow" in Latin) being passed via urine.

Berocca's effervescent tablets contain small quantities of aspartame (phenylalanine).

== Marketing ==
In March 2011, the Health Department of Australia moved to withdraw the advertising of Berocca for its unsubstantiated claims of providing invigoration. The same department had given Berocca a Healthcare product award in November 2010.

In June 2014, a 30-second television ad entitled "Mind and Body," featuring Joel McHale and Kali "Muscle" Kirkendall, and backed by the song "Sirius" from the 1982 album "Eye in the Sky" by The Alan Parsons Project, first appeared on US national television and cable networks.

== See also ==
- Redoxon
- Emergen-C
