= Advil =

American brand of ibuprofen

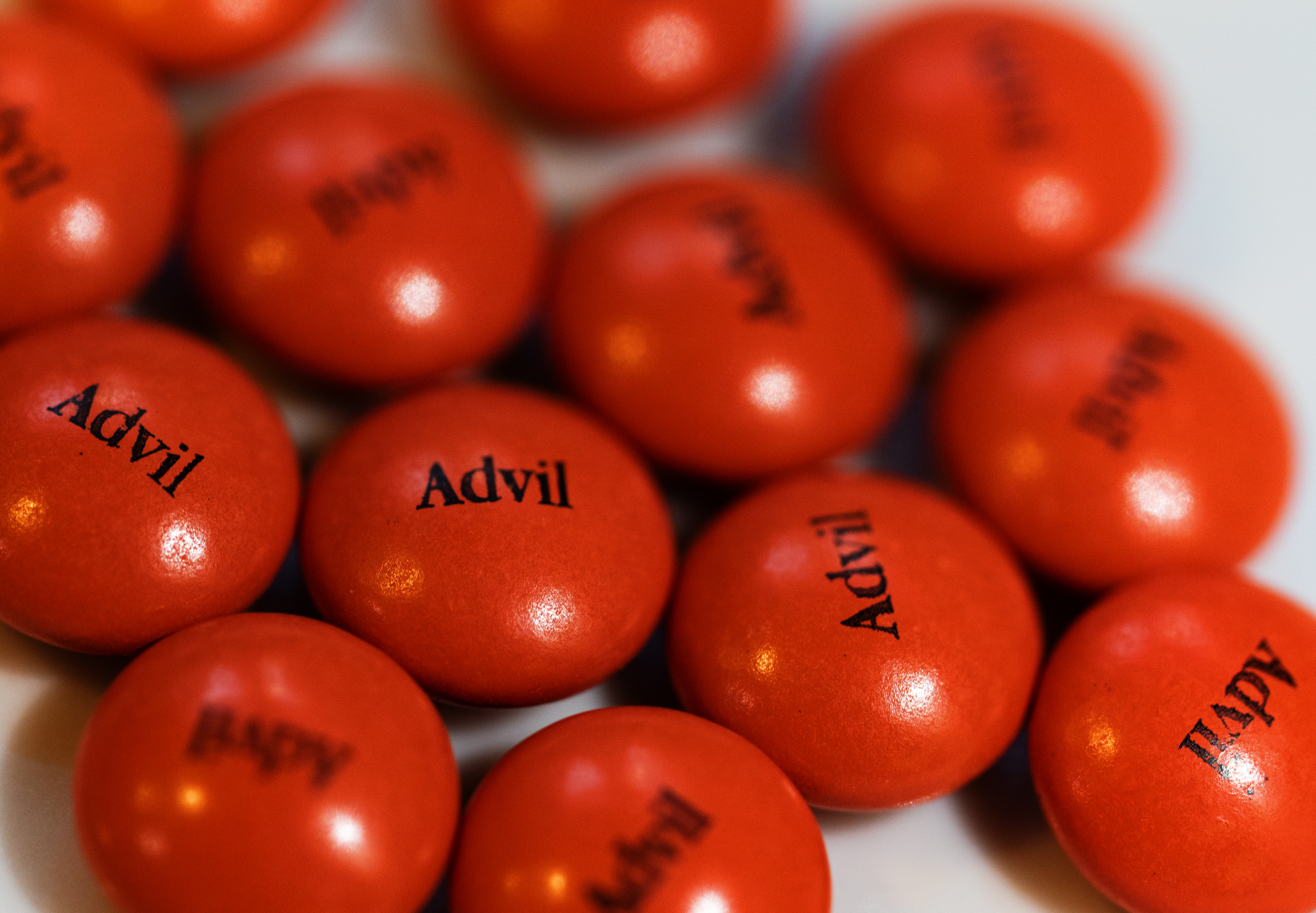
- A version of Advil tablets
- Product type: Medication
- Current owner: Haleon
- Introduced: 1984; 42 years ago
- Previous owners: Wyeth; Pfizer
- Website: www.advil.com

Advil is a brand of pain-relieving medication owned by Haleon. The primary active ingredient in most Advil-branded products is ibuprofen, a nonsteroidal anti-inflammatory drug. Advil has been called a "megabrand" because it offers various "products for a wide range of pain, head cold, and sleep problems."

== History ==
The owner of Advil

The brand first entered the American market in 1984 through Whitehall (itself a division of Wyeth, which was purchased by Pfizer in 2009), the same year ibuprofen gained Food and Drug Administration (FDA) approval for over-the-counter (OTC) sales in the United States (being available via prescription since 1974). Pfizer and GlaxoSmithKline (GSK) combined their consumer healthcare departments into a dual venture in mid-2019; in 2022, this joint venture was spun-off into the newly conceived Haleon. In early 2025, Pfizer sold its entire stake in Haleon for over three billion dollars.

Advil and a competing OTC ibuprofen brand, Nuprin, were first announced to the public on May 18, 1984, the same day that the FDA approved OTC sales of ibuprofen. Within a week of the announcement, Advil was available for purchase at some stores. Within ten years of having a market presence, it outsold Bayer Aspirin and was a fierce competitor to Tylenol (primarily a brand of acetaminophen). In the mid-1990s, for example, it held 13% of the multibillion-dollar over-the-counter American market for analgesics.

== Varieties ==
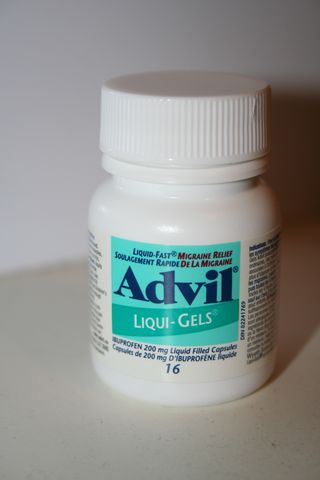
One variety of Advil

In 2024, there were 23 varieties of Advil available on the U.S. market including:

- Advil
- Advil Liqui-Gels
- Advil Migraine Liqui-Gels
- Infant's Advil
- Pediatric Advil
- Junior Strength Advil
- Children's Advil
- Flavored Children's Advil
- Advil Dual Action With Acetaminophen (Ibuprofen/acetaminophen)
- Advil PM (with Diphenhydramine)
- Advil Cold And Sinus (with Pseudoephedrine)
- Advil Congestion Relief (with Phenylephrine)
- Advil Allergy Sinus (with Chlorpheniramine and Pseudoephedrine)
- Advil Allergy And Congestion Relief (with Chlorpheniramine and Phenylephrine)
- Advil Multi-Symptom Cold & Flu (with Chlorpheniramine and Phenylephrine)
- Children's Advil Cold (with Pseudoephedrine)
- Children's Advil Allergy Sinus (with Chlorpheniramine and Pseudoephedrine)

== Marketing ==
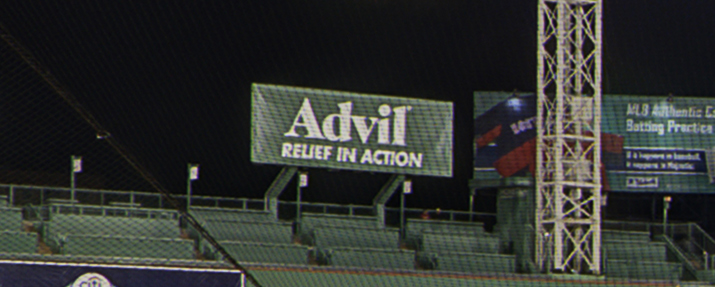
An Advil advertisement at a major sports stadium in 2013

Marketing campaigns for the brand (some including celebrities like Regis Philbin) have pushed slogans such as "Take Action. Take Advil." and have been presented under the premise of "True Advil Stories"; the brand has also been involved in sponsorship deals such as with Major League Pickleball. In late 2024, Haleon, "the parent company of brands like Advil, Tums, Centrum and Sensodyne[,] announced that it is the official consumer healthcare product partner of U.S. Soccer."
