= Parodontax =

British toothpaste brand

- Logo used until 2025
- Product type: Oral hygiene
- Current owner: Haleon
- Country: Germany
- Introduced: 1937; 89 years ago
- Markets: Worldwide
- Previous owners: Madaus AG Block Drug; GSK
- Website: Website

Parodontax is a brand name of toothpaste, mouthwash, and toothbrush owned by Haleon.

== History ==
Parodontax toothpaste was developed in 1937 by German dentist Dr. Focke. The product was originally based on sodium bicarbonate. Consequently, it was obtained by German pharmaceutical company Madaus, which specialised in herbal medicine and which added components that were specifically anti-inflammatory and antibacterial, including extracts of several medicinal plants.

The historic ingredients of the toothpaste contained the following elements: sodium bicarbonate, water, glycerin, cocamidopropyl betaine, alcohol, Krameria (Krameria triandra) root extract, Echinacea (Echinacea purpurea) flower/leaf/stem extract, denatured alcohol, xanthan gum, chamomile (Chamomilla recutita) extract, Myrrh (Commiphora myrrha) extract, sodium saccharin, sodium benzoate, sage (Salvia officinalis) oil, wild mint (Mentha arvensis) oil, limonene, and iron oxide. These herbal extracts gave the toothpaste a particular salty taste.

In 1975, Parodontax launched the first product containing chlorhexidine digluconate in Germany. Since 1989, the active substance chlorhexidine digluconate has been widely used in the treatment of gum disease. Over the years, a wide range of pharmaceutical products, including mouthwashes, sprays and gels, have been developed to provide effective short-term treatment for gingivitis.

In 2001,the brand was obtained by GSK which continued the production according to the old recipe. However, in 2017 the herbal extracts were removed leaving the toothpaste with the active ingredient stannous fluoride and the abrasive ingredient sodium bicarbonate. Nevertheless, the producers claim that the paste still has the ability to heal bleeding gums, which is debated by dentist associations.

A 2015 systematic review concluded that while the toothpaste had short-term effects on both plaque and gingival inflammation, longer-term studies were needed to gauge its effectiveness as anti-gingivitis agent.

== See also ==
- List of toothpaste brands
- Index of oral health and dental articles
