= Rembrandt toothpaste =

American brand of toothpaste

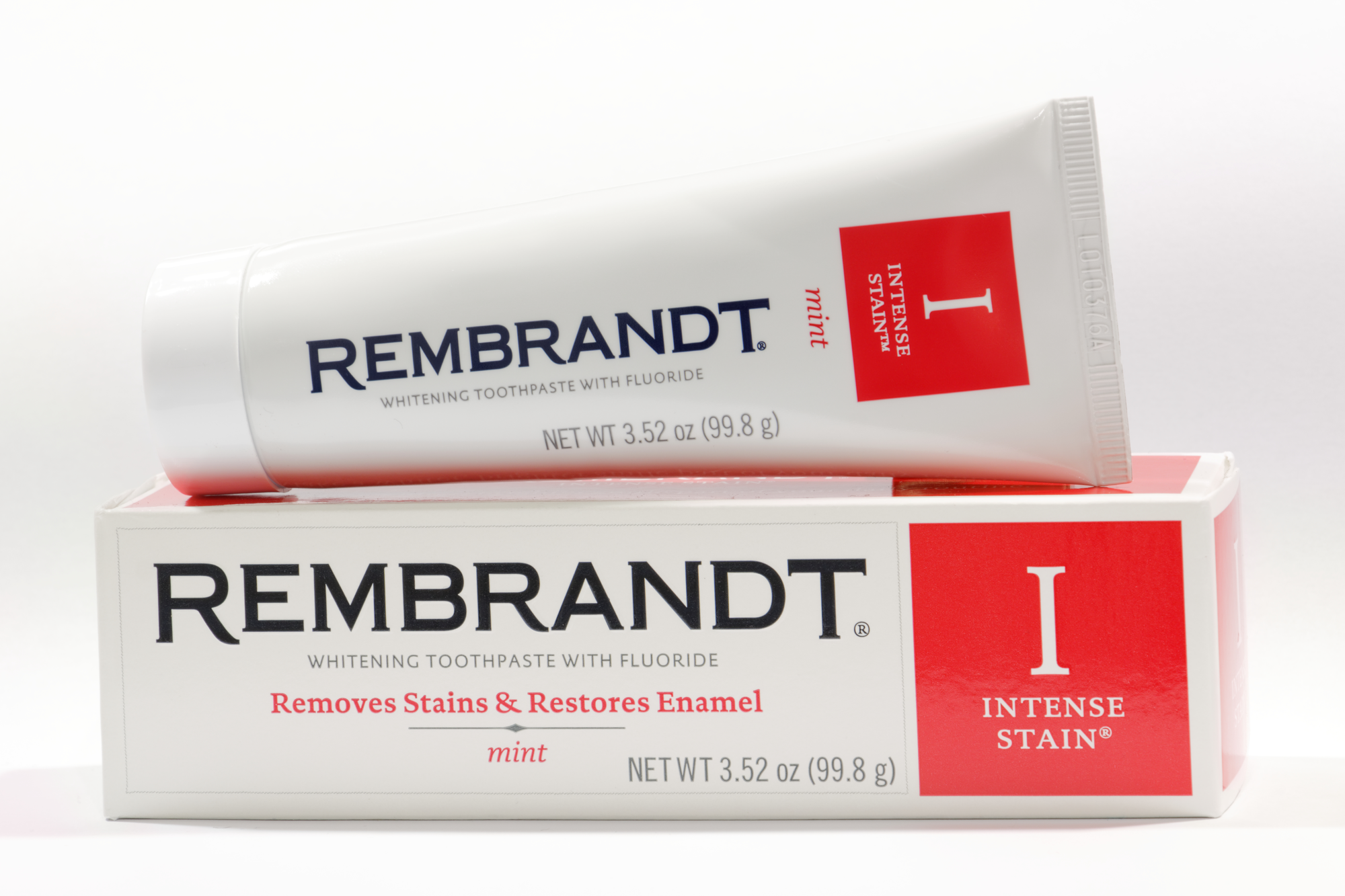
- Rembrandt Intense Stain toothpaste
- Product type: Toothpaste
- Current owner: Ranir LLC
- Country: United States
- Introduced: 1990; 36 years ago
- Discontinued: Gentle White line, in 2012; 14 years ago
- Previous owners: Den-Mat Corp.; Gillette; Johnson & Johnson
- Website: REMBRANDT

Rembrandt toothpaste is an American brand of toothpaste.

== History ==
In 1990, the Rembrandt toothpaste brand was developed and owned by closely held Den-Mat Corp, which had been founded in 1974 by dentist Dr. Robert Ibsen. In 2003, it had about $73 million in sales.

In 2004, Gillette purchased the Rembrandt brand. As part of Procter & Gamble's acquisition of Gillette in 2005, the company was required by the Federal Trade Commission to divest itself of Rembrandt. Consequently, it sold Rembrandt to Johnson & Johnson's McNeil-PPC division. That year, Rembrandt had sales that likely exceeded $100 million.

== Products ==
Rembrandt Intense Stain and Rembrandt Deeply White toothpaste contain hydrated silica.

In a study published in 2011 in the Journal of Clinical Dentistry, Rembrandt Intense Stain was found to have a relative dentin abrasion of around 90 (mildly abrasive) and was in the middle of those tested in terms of cleaning.

Rembrandt offered Canker Sore Toothpaste for the benefit of "canker sore" (i.e. aphthous stomatitis) sufferers in 1993, reformulated the toothpaste in 2008, and changed its name to Rembrandt's Gentle White in 2012. Johnson & Johnson marketed it as a whitening toothpaste that was gentle enough for people whose mouths were prone to canker sores. The company targeted, and the toothpaste was used by, canker sore sufferers. Approximately 20% of the general population suffer from canker sores, which can make eating, swallowing, or talking painful.

Rembrandt's Gentle White does not contain sodium lauryl sulfate (SLS), an ingredient that a Swedish study showed was dramatically correlated with canker sores.

Rembrandt discontinued the canker sore toothpaste line in 2012.

== See also ==
- List of toothpaste brands
- Index of oral health and dental articles
