= Anadin =

Painkiller brand

Anadin is a brand of painkiller sold in the UK and Ireland, launched in 1932, originally by American pharmaceutical company Anacin and currently by Haleon.

== Types ==
Several different types of painkiller are sold under the brand. As of April 2009, these included:

- Anadin Original – aspirin and caffeine based
- Anadin paracetamol tablets – launched in 1988
- Anadin ibuprofen tablets – launched in 1997
- Anadin Extra – aspirin, paracetamol and caffeine based (ordinary version launched in 1983 and soluble version in 1992)
- Anadin Joint Pain
- Anadin Liquifast (or Anadin Ultra) – ibuprofen-based liquid capsules (ordinary and "Double strength" versions)

== Criticism ==
Along with other brands, Anadin's paracetamol tablets have been criticised for being overpriced compared to non-branded versions (e.g. in 2008 16 Anadin Paracetamol tablets each containing 500 mg of paracetamol cost around £2.09 while non-branded equivalents retailed for around £0.35).

== See also ==
- Anacin (American original brand launched in the UK as Anadin in 1932)
