= Biotene =

Dental hygiene brand

Biotene (stylised as Biotène) is an over-the-counter dental hygiene product currently marketed by Haleon (previously by GSK plc). It is available in various forms, including toothpaste, mouthwash, and gel.

== Ingredients ==
=== Regular ===
The main active ingredient in Biotène toothpaste is sodium monofluorophosphate. Prior to the GSK acquisition, it also contained enzymes such as glucose oxidase, lactoferrin, lactoperoxidase, and lysozyme.

=== PBF (discontinued) ===
The Plaque Biofilm (PBF) product line contained additional enzymes, including mutanase, dextranase, lysozyme, lactoperoxidase, and glucose oxidase.

== Benefits ==
People with xerostomia (dry mouth) may use Biotène to reduce the recurrence of dental plaque. However, Biotène alone does not significantly reduce the count of Streptococcus mutans, the primary bacterium responsible for the formation of dental plaque.

Biotène claims to relieve symptoms of dry mouth by providing moisture. Dry mouth can be caused by various factors affecting the salivary glands. By keeping the mouth moisturized, Biotène helps prevent complications associated with prolonged dry mouth. For example, dry mouth impairs the antimicrobial properties of saliva, increasing the risk of opportunistic infections. Additionally, by improving the lubrication of the oropharyngeal mucosa, Biotène can facilitate swallowing and reduce the likelihood of developing dysphagia. A 2017 pilot study found that perceived swallowing effort significantly decreased following the application of a saliva substitute.

Biotène compensates for decreased salivary function. A lack of saliva compromises the composition and beneficial properties necessary for maintaining the health of the oral cavity, reducing antibacterial action and disrupting the oral pH. This disruption allows cariogenic microorganisms to grow and colonize the oral cavity. When stimulation of salivary secretion fails, palliative oral care in the form of mouthwashes and saliva substitutes, such as Biotène, can help counterbalance the lack of natural salivary function. Various saliva substitutes containing different enzymes, like those found in Biotène products, help reduce oral infections and enhance mouth wetting. Biotène mouth rinses have shown inhibitory effects on the growth of preformed biofilms on certain tested bacterial and fungal strains. However, Biotène does not act through mechanisms that prevent plaque build-up or antimicrobial chemotherapeutic action.

== Biotène brand products ==
The product line includes toothpaste, mouthwash, spray, and gel.

== Mechanism of action ==
The three primary enzymes in Biotène were glucose oxidase, lactoperoxidase, and lysozyme. These enzymes, through their antibacterial and healing properties, create natural protection within the oral cavity, balancing and boosting an individual's salivary defenses.

The reduced antibacterial action of saliva, due to its lack in some individuals, can lead to disruption of the oral pH, allowing cariogenic microorganisms to grow and colonize the oral cavity. For individuals with xerostomia, a commercially available mouth rinse that can be safely used daily to aid in dry mouth relief is essential for oral health maintenance. Various commercially available mouth rinses have been tested for their inhibitory effects on biofilm formation over a 24-hour period. By slowing the formation of biofilms, individuals who use Biotène may reduce the risk of dental caries and other oral diseases that can arise from xerostomia and bacterial accumulation, thus improving both oral and overall health in the long term. However, not all studies support Biotène's claims. For example, Peridex mouth rinse, an antimicrobial chlorhexidine-based formulation, demonstrated significantly greater prevention of plaque regrowth compared to water and the enzyme-based Biotène mouth rinse.
