= Dimetapp =

Brand of medication

Dimetapp is an American brand of over-the-counter cold and allergy medicines first introduced in 1959, that is manufactured by Foundation Consumer Brands. At one point, Dimetapp as a household word referred to a single combination preparation marketed to relieve symptoms of the common cold, containing brompheniramine (an antihistamine) and phenylephrine (decongestant replacing the formerly used pseudoephedrine, which itself replaced phenylpropanolamine). Variants were created, including Dimetapp DM with the addition of dextromethorphan (an antitussive or cough suppressant). Dimetapp Elixir and Colour Free Elixir are intended to relieve nasal congestion, runny nose, itchy watery eyes and sneezing, whereas Dimetapp DM and Dimetapp DM Colour Free Elixir are intended for colds with dry coughs and also to treat whooping cough. Early Dimetapp was flavored with cherry and plum as they were readily available during the time, setting a precedent for its purple color; however, the flavor has been described as a grape candy. Like many over-the-counter medications, Dimetapp relies on marketing and branding as differentiators of otherwise similar (often identical) branded and unbranded medications to maintain their premium pricing. Additionally, the actual medications are subject to remarketing in other brands. As an example, "Children's Dimetapp ND" is a 10 mg orally disintegrating loratadine tablet with a "cool blast" flavour additive. The same product with a "Citrus Burst" flavour additive was also manufactured and distributed by Wyeth but branded and marketed as "Alavert" (not "children's").

Dimetapp was acquired by Pfizer in the 2009 acquisition of Wyeth.

Foundation Consumer Brands acquired Dimetapp in September 2020.
