= Solpadeine =

Brand name of a range of analgesic medication

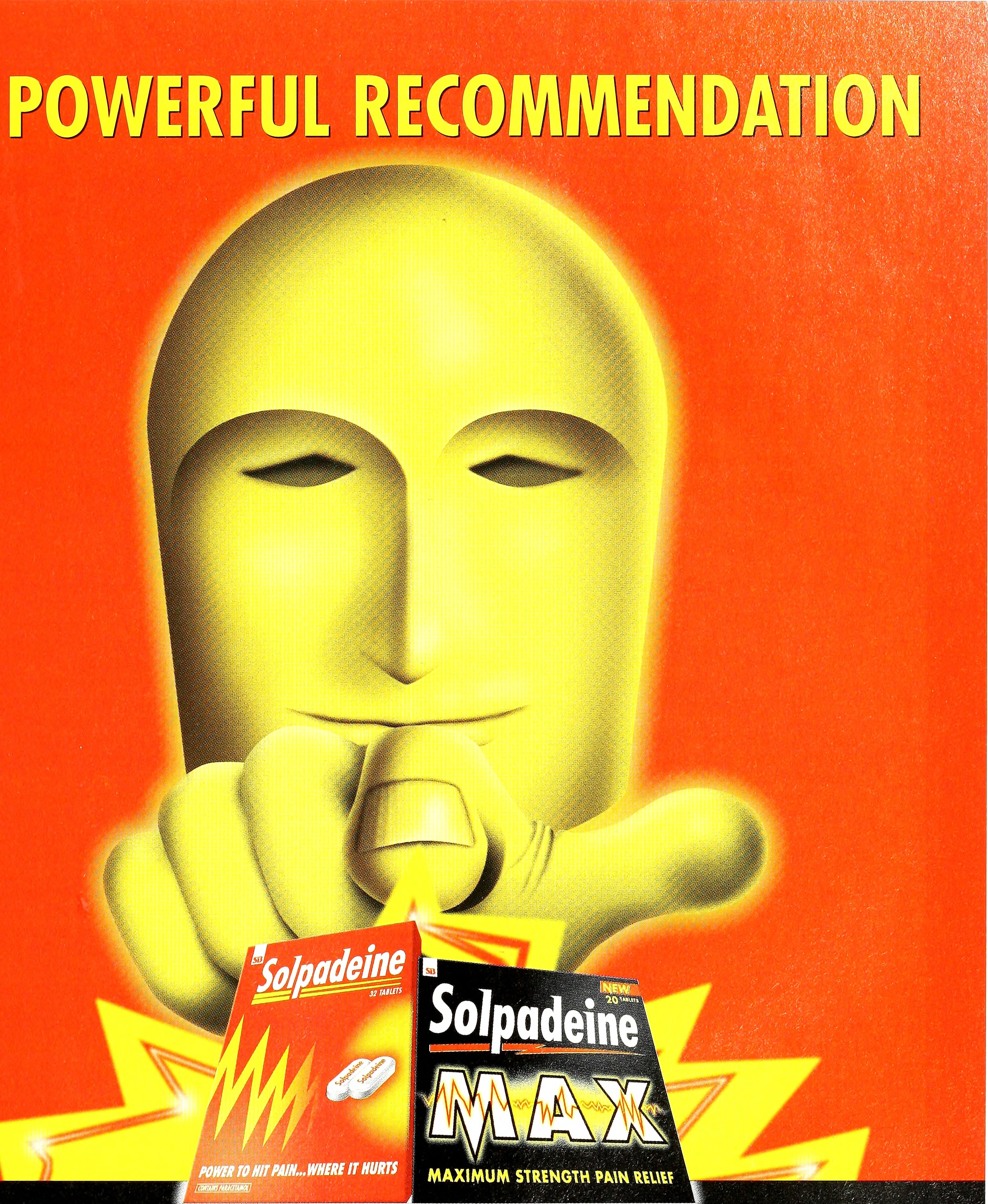
1998 advertisement

Solpadeine is the brand name of a range of analgesic medication containing various amounts of paracetamol, ibuprofen, caffeine and codeine, made by Omega Pharma. The range was previously made by GlaxoSmithKline, which sold its portfolio of over-the-counter drugs to Omega Pharma in 2012.

In the United Kingdom there are four different medicines using the Solpadeine name, with different active ingredients. The range includes:

- Solpadeine Headache, containing paracetamol with caffeine
- Solpadeine Plus, a compound analgesic containing paracetamol and codeine (co-codamol), with caffeine
- Solpadeine Max, a compound analgesic containing paracetamol and codeine (with a higher codeine content than Solpadeine Plus)
- Solpadeine Migraine, a compound analgesic containing ibuprofen and codeine

In 2016 it was one of the biggest selling branded over-the-counter medications in Great Britain, with sales of £43.1 million.

In Australia it is marketed as Panadeine.
