= Centrum (multivitamin) =

Brand of multivitamins

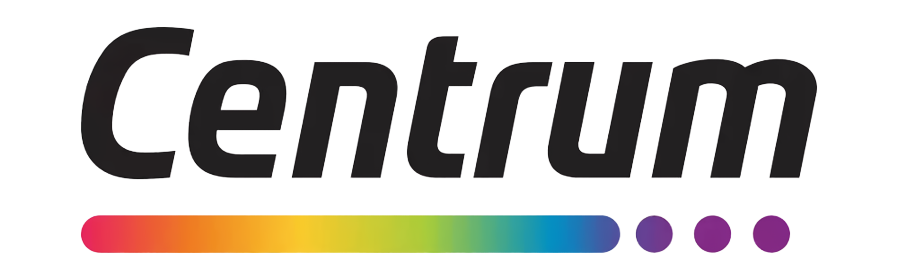
- Product type: Multivitamins
- Current owner: Haleon
- Country: United States
- Introduced: 1978; 48 years ago
- Previous owners: Wyeth; Pfizer; GSK
- Ambassadors: Sam Milby; Precious Lara Quigaman; Piolo Pascual; Angel Locsin
- Website: www.centrum.com

Centrum is an American brand of multivitamins produced by Haleon. It was designed by Dr. Ellenbogen's team, working at Lederle Laboratories, and was introduced in 1978. It has been owned by Wyeth, Pfizer, GSK, and now Haleon.

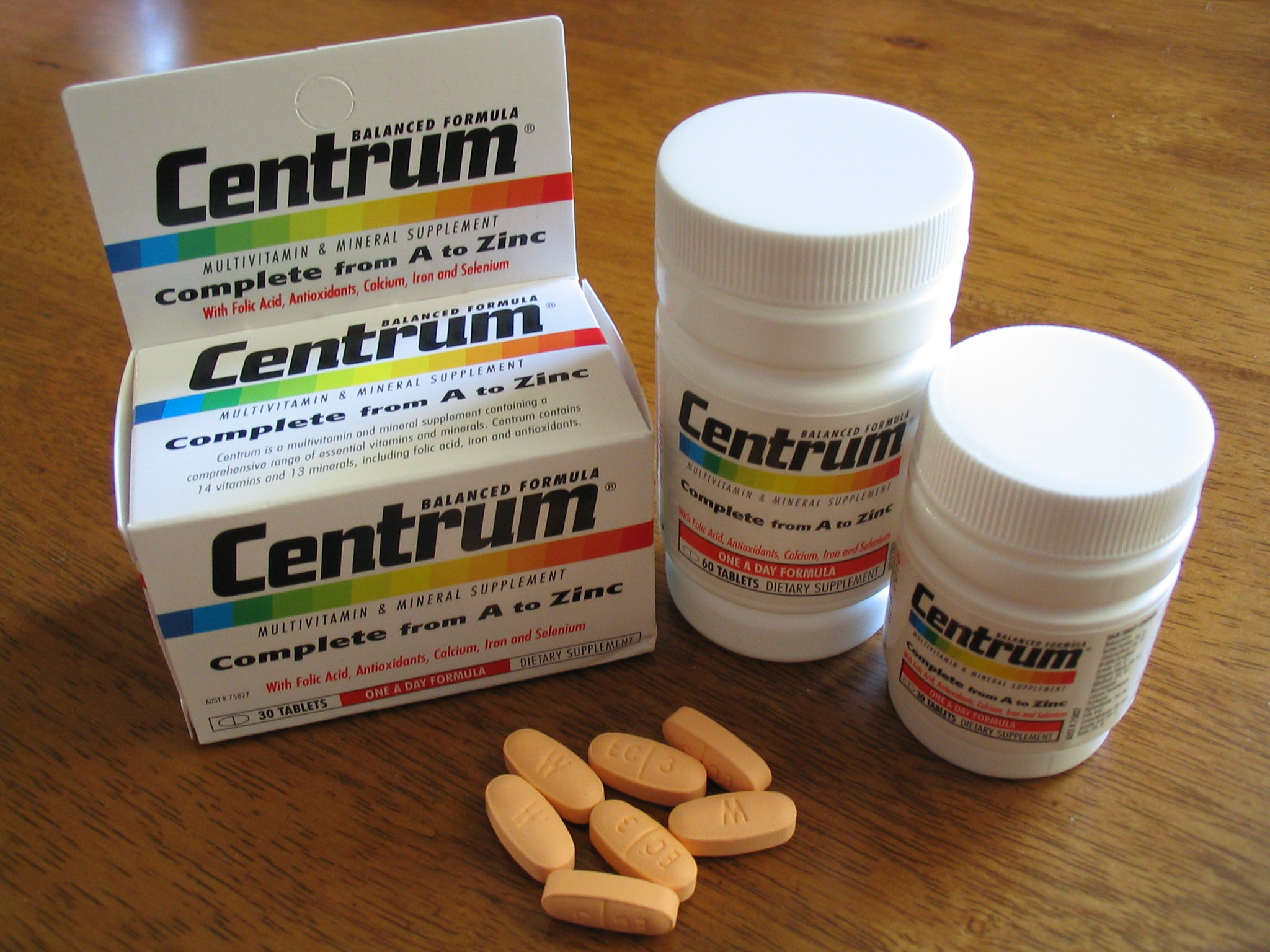
Centrum multivitamins in Australasian packaging

== Physicians' Health Study II ==
In 2012, the Physicians' Health Study II (PHS-II) found that participants who took a Centrum-brand multivitamin each day for an average of 11 years had no change in cancer mortality or cardiovascular disease mortality compared to the placebo group. The authors did find a slight reduction in cancer incidence although this conclusion was questioned in the Journal of the American Medical Association.

On October 17, 2012, researchers reported on a double-blind study of 14,641 male U.S. physicians initially aged 50 years or older (mean age of 64.3, standard deviation 9.2 years), that began in 1997 with treatment and follow-up through June 1, 2011. They compared total cancer (excluding nonmelanoma skin cancer) for participants taking a daily multivitamin (Centrum Silver by Pfizer) versus placebo. Compared with placebo, men taking a daily multivitamin had a statistically significant reduction in the incidence of total cancer, with a hazard ratio (HR) = 0.92 (95% confidence interval (CI) 0.86-0.998; P = .04). No statistically significant effects were found for any specific cancers or cancer mortality. The 95% CI of the hazard ratio implied a benefit of between 14% and .2% over placebo. In absolute terms the difference was 1.3 cancer diagnoses, per 1000 years of life (18.3-17 events, respectively). The median follow up time was 11.2 years. The paper's co-principal investigator, Dr. J. Michael Gaziano, a cardiologist, was quoted by The New York Times as saying "it certainly appears there is a modest reduction in the risk of cancer from a typical multivitamin." The study was also featured in The Wall Street Journal on October 17, 2012.

An editorial in the same issue of the Journal of the American Medical Association (JAMA), reflecting the opinion of JAMA, was dismissive of the report on several counts. First, they said, "it seems unlikely that a common characteristic across all diseases included under this wide category of cancer would be a protective effect from multivitamins", suggesting if no specific cancer was effected, why would general cancer risk be so affected. Second, they questioned the study's abilities to deliver on the question of whether a multivitamin would be protective in a well-nourished population (Bayesian probability) stating: "The plausibility of a protective effect is reduced by the absence of a clear path through which 30 different vitamins and minerals would cause a decline in the risk of multiple cancers and, especially, by the negative pattern of prior results." In addition the investigators observed no difference in effect whether the study participants were or were not adherent to the multivitamin intervention, which diminishes the dose–response relationship.

The editorial was critical of the statistical multiplicity (multiple comparisons): the complete planned analysis of the primary and secondary end points in the PHS II study would entail 28 tests of association; each of which has "some possibility of yielding a statistically significant result by chance alone, even when there is no true treatment effect. [...] when this finding is considered in the context of the number of already completed and planned analyses of the same study, the strength of the inference is weaker, because the likelihood of a randomly occurring finding [...] is much greater." They concluded that any of the conventional P value corrections for multiple comparisons would eliminate the apparent "statistical significance" of the results.

From the same double-blind study, they found that taking a daily multivitamin did not have any effect in reducing heart attacks and other major cardiovascular events, MI, stroke, and CVD mortality.
