= Multivitamin =

Dietary supplement containing vitamins

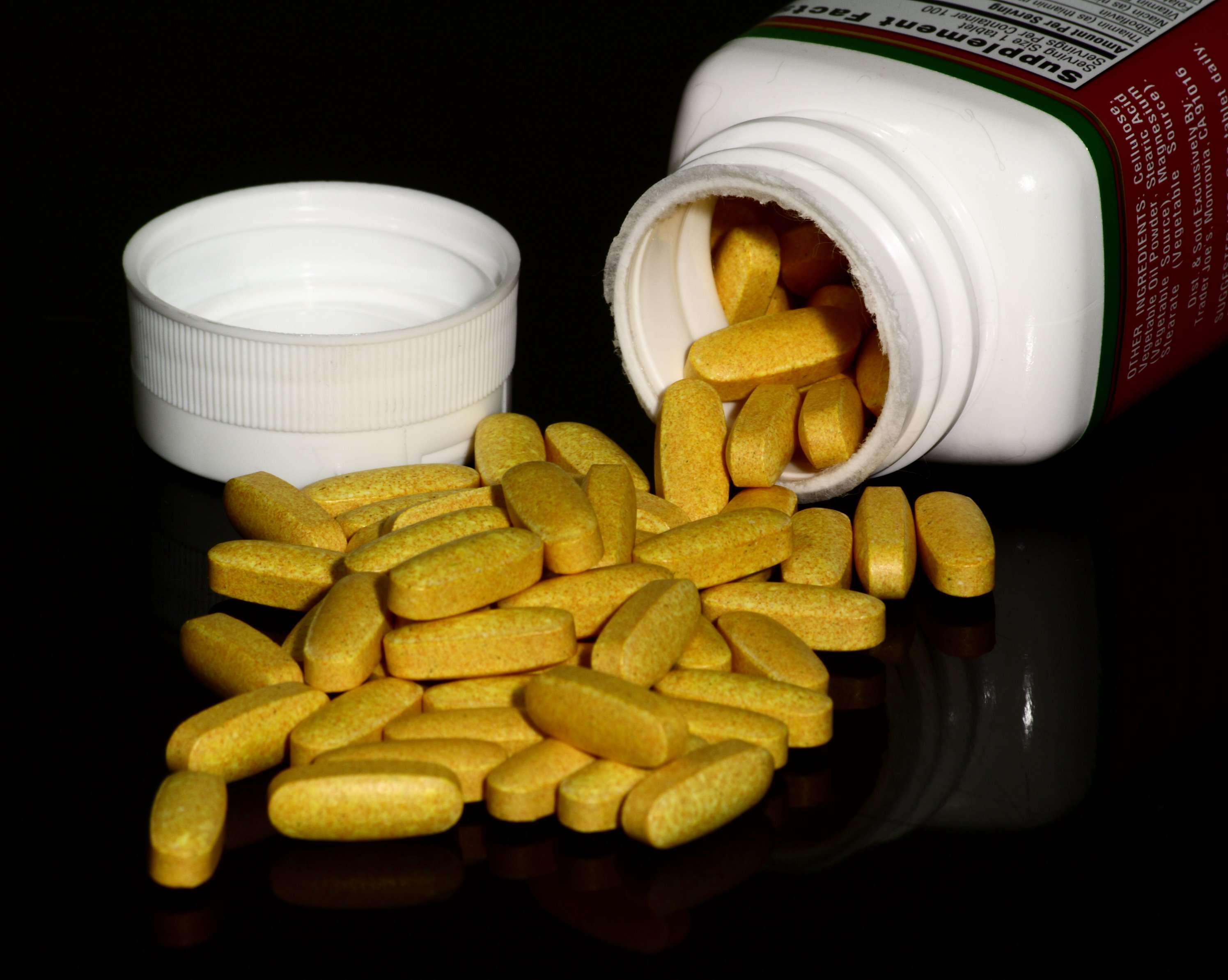
Multivitamins contain multiple micro-nutrients, such as vitamins and dietary minerals.

A multivitamin is a preparation intended to serve as a dietary supplement with vitamins, dietary minerals, and other nutritional elements. Such preparations are available in the form of tablets, capsules, pastilles, powders, liquids, gummies, or injectable formulations. Other than injectable formulations, which are only available and administered under medical supervision, multivitamins are recognized by the Codex Alimentarius Commission (the United Nations' authority on food standards) as a category of food.

In healthy people, most scientific evidence indicates that multivitamin supplements do not prevent cancer, heart disease, or other ailments, and regular supplementation is not necessary. However, specific groups of people may benefit from multivitamin supplements, for example, people with poor nutrition or those at high risk of macular degeneration, and women who are pregnant or trying to get pregnant.

There is no standardized scientific definition for multivitamin. In the United States, a multivitamin/mineral supplement is defined as a supplement containing three or more vitamins and minerals that does not include herbs, hormones, or drugs, where each vitamin and mineral is included at a dose below the tolerable upper intake level as determined by the Food and Drug Board, and does not present a risk of adverse health effects.

== Products and components ==
Many multivitamin formulas contain vitamin C, B_{1}, B_{2}, B_{3}, B_{5}, B_{6}, B_{7}, B_{9}, B_{12}, A, E, D_{2} (or D_{3}), K, potassium, iodine, selenium, borate, zinc, calcium, magnesium, manganese, molybdenum, beta carotene, and/or iron. Multivitamins are typically available in a variety of formulas based on age and sex, or (as in prenatal vitamins) based on more specific nutritional needs; a multivitamin for men might include less iron, while a multivitamin for seniors might include extra vitamin D. Some formulas make a point of including extra antioxidants.

Most multivitamins come in the form of tablets, capsule, powders, liquids, gummies or injectable formulations. In the United States, the Food and Drug Administration requires any product marketed as a "multivitamin" to contain at least three vitamins and minerals; furthermore, the dosages must be below a "tolerable upper limit", and a multivitamin may not include herbs, hormones, or drugs.

== Uses ==
For certain people, particularly for older people, supplementing the diet with additional vitamins and minerals can have health impacts; however, the majority will not benefit. People with dietary imbalances may include those on restrictive diets and those who cannot or will not eat a nutritious diet. Pregnant women and elderly adults have different nutritional needs compared to other adults, and a multivitamin may be indicated by a physician. Generally, medical advice is to avoid multivitamins during pregnancy, particularly those containing vitamin A, unless they are recommended by a health care professional. However, the NHS recommends 10μg of Vitamin D per day throughout the pregnancy and while breastfeeding, and 400μg of folic acid during the first trimester (first 12 weeks of pregnancy). Some women may need to take iron, vitamin C, or calcium supplements during pregnancy, but only on the advice of a doctor.

In the 1999–2000 National Health and Nutrition Examination Survey, 52% of adults in the United States reported taking at least one dietary supplement in the last month and 35% reported regular use of multivitamin - multimineral supplements. Women versus men, older adults versus younger adults, non-Hispanic whites versus non-Hispanic blacks, and those with higher education levels versus lower education levels (among other categories) were more likely to take multivitamins. Individuals who use dietary supplements (including multivitamins) generally report higher dietary nutrient intakes and healthier diets. Additionally, adults with a history of prostate and breast cancers were more likely to use dietary and multivitamin supplements.

== Precautions ==

The amounts of each vitamin type in multivitamin formulations are generally adapted to correlate with what is believed to result in optimal health effects in large population groups. However, these standard amounts may not correlate with what is optimal in certain subpopulations, such as in children, pregnant women and people with certain medical conditions and medication.

The health benefit of vitamins generally follows a biphasic dose-response curve, taking the shape of a bell curve, with the area in the middle being the safe-intake range and the edges representing deficiency and toxicity. For example, the Food and Drug Administration recommends that adults on a 2,000 calorie diet get between 60 and 90 milligrams of vitamin C per day. This is the middle of the bell curve. The upper limit is 2,000 milligrams per day for adults, which is considered potentially dangerous.

In particular, pregnant women should consult their doctors before taking any multivitamins. For example, either an excess or deficiency of vitamin A can cause birth defects.

Long-term use of beta-carotene, vitamin A, and vitamin E supplements may shorten life, and increase the risk of lung cancer in people who smoke (especially those smoking more than 20 cigarettes per day), former smokers, people exposed to asbestos, and those who use alcohol. Many common brand supplements in the United States contain levels above the DRI/RDA amounts for some vitamins or minerals.

Severe vitamin and mineral deficiencies require medical treatment and can be very difficult to treat with common over-the-counter multivitamins. In such situations, special vitamin or mineral forms with much higher potencies are available, either as individual components or as specialized formulations.

Multivitamins in large quantities may pose a risk of an acute overdose due to the toxicity of some components, principally iron. However, in contrast to iron tablets, which can be lethal to children, toxicity from overdoses of multivitamins are very rare. There appears to be little risk to supplement users of experiencing acute side effects due to excessive intakes of micronutrients. There also are strict limits on the retinol content for vitamin A during pregnancies that are specifically addressed by prenatal formulas.

As noted in dietary guidelines from the Harvard T.H. Chan School of Public Health, multivitamins should not replace healthy eating or make up for unhealthy eating, but may be applicable for people with certain nutritional challenges, such as the elderly, some diseases, and during pregnancy. In 2015, the U.S. Preventive Services Task Force analyzed studies that included data for about 450,000 people. The analysis found no clear evidence that multivitamins prevent cancer or heart disease, helped people live longer, or "made them healthier in any way".

== Research ==
Provided that precautions are taken (such as adjusting the vitamin amounts to what is believed to be appropriate for children, pregnant women or people with certain medical conditions), multivitamin intake is generally safe, but research is still ongoing with regard to what health effects multivitamins have.

Evidence of health effects of multivitamins comes largely from prospective cohort studies, which evaluate health differences between groups that take multivitamins and groups that do not. Correlations between multivitamin intake and health found by such studies may not result from multivitamins themselves, but may reflect underlying characteristics of multivitamin-takers. For example, it has been suggested that multivitamin-takers may, overall, have more underlying diseases (making multivitamins appear as less beneficial in prospective cohort studies). On the other hand, it has also been suggested that multivitamin users may, overall, be more health-conscious (making multivitamins appear as more beneficial in prospective cohort studies). Randomized controlled studies have been encouraged to address this uncertainty.

=== Cohort studies ===
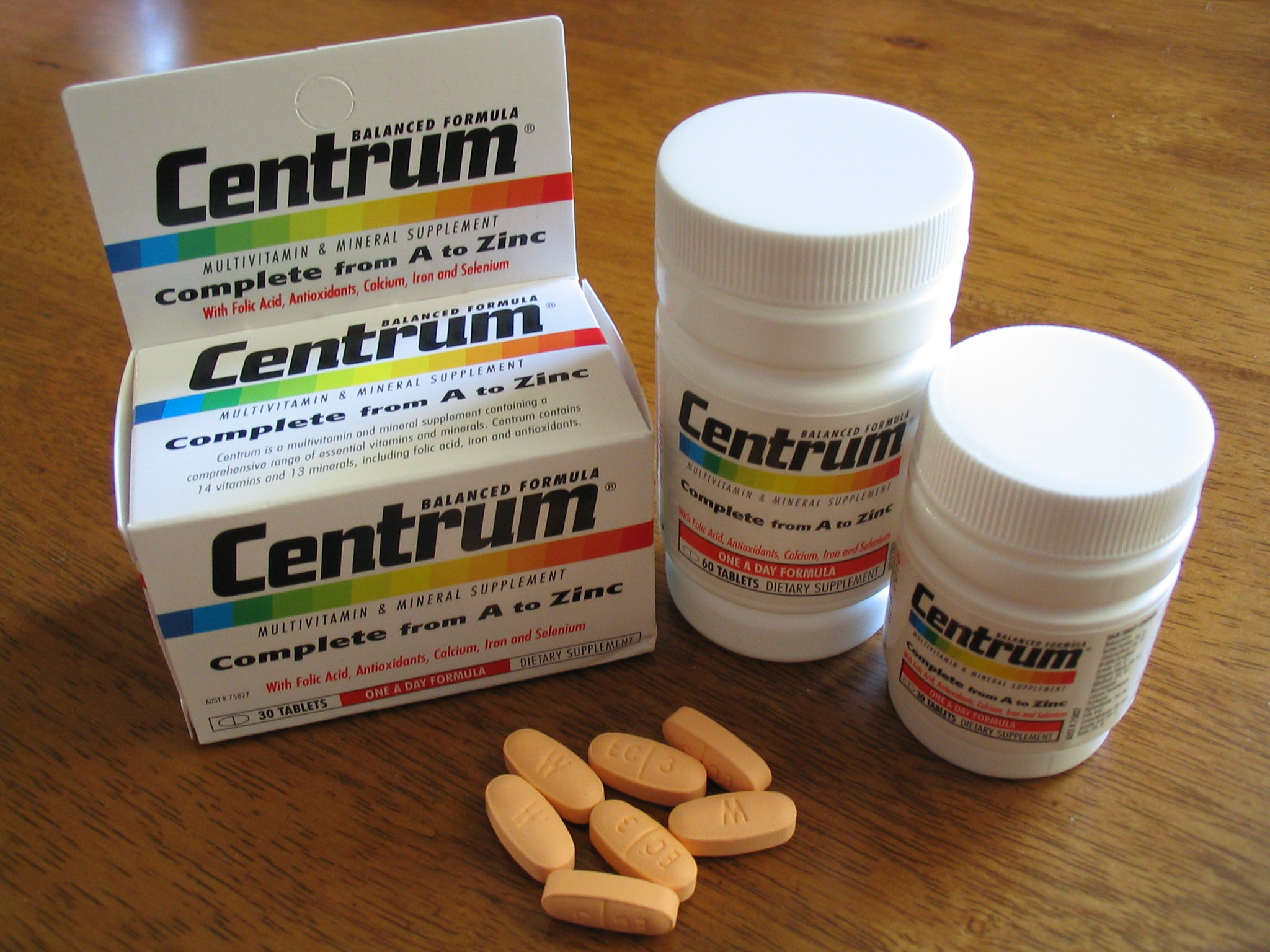
Centrum multivitamins produced by Pfizer, which were used in Physicians' Health Study II

In February 2009, a study conducted in 161,808 postmenopausal women from the Women's Health Initiative clinical trials concluded that after eight years of follow-up "multivitamin use has little or no influence on the risk of common cancers, cardiovascular disease, or total mortality". Another 2010 study in the Journal of Clinical Oncology suggested that multivitamin use during chemotherapy for stage III colon cancer had no effect on the outcomes of treatment. A very large prospective cohort study published in 2011, including more than 180,000 participants, found no significant association between multivitamin use and mortality from all causes. The study also found no impact of multivitamin use on the risk of cardiovascular disease or cancer.

A cohort study that received widespread media attention is the Physicians' Health Study II (PHS-II). PHS-II was a double-blind study of 14,641 male U.S. physicians initially aged 50 years or older (mean age of 64.3) that ran from 1997 to June 1, 2011. The mean time that the men were followed was 11 years. The study compared total cancer (excluding non-melanoma skin cancer) for participants taking a daily multivitamin (Centrum Silver by Pfizer) versus a placebo. Compared with the placebo, men taking a daily multivitamin had a small but statistically significant reduction in their total incidence of cancer. In absolute terms, the difference was just 1.3 cancer diagnoses per 1000 years of life. The hazard ratio for cancer diagnosis was 0.92 with a 95% confidence interval spanning 0.86–0.998 (P = .04); this implies a benefit of between 14% and .2% over placebo in the confidence interval. No statistically significant effects were found for any specific cancers or for cancer mortality. As pointed out in an editorial in the same issue of the Journal of the American Medical Association, the investigators observed no difference in the effect whether the study participants were or were not adherent to the multivitamin intervention, which diminishes the dose–response relationship. The same editorial argued that the study did not properly address the multiple comparisons problem, in that the authors neglected to fully analyze all 28 possible associations in the study—they argue if this had been done, the statistical significance of the results would be lost.

Using the same PHS-II study, researchers concluded that taking a daily multivitamin did not have any effect in reducing heart attacks and other major cardiovascular events, MI, stroke, and CVD mortality.

=== Systematic reviews and meta-analyses ===
One major meta-analysis published in 2011, including previous cohort and case-control studies, concluded that multivitamin use was not significantly associated with the risk of breast cancer. It noted that one Swedish cohort study has indicated such an effect, but with all studies taken together, the association was not statistically significant. A 2012 meta-analysis of ten randomized, placebo-controlled trials published in the Journal of Alzheimer's Disease found that a daily multivitamin may improve immediate recall memory, but did not affect any other measure of cognitive function.

Another meta-analysis, published in 2013, found that multivitamin-multimineral treatment "has no effect on mortality risk", and a 2013 systematic review found that multivitamin supplementation did not increase mortality and might slightly decrease it. A 2014 meta-analysis reported that there was "sufficient evidence to support the role of dietary multivitamin/mineral supplements for the decreasing the risk of age-related cataracts". A 2015 meta-analysis argued that the positive result regarding the effect of vitamins on cancer incidence found in Physicians' Health Study II (discussed above) should not be overlooked despite the neutral results found in other studies.

Looking at 2012 data, a study published in 2018 presented meta-analyses on cardiovascular disease outcomes and all-cause mortality. It found that "conclusive evidence for the benefit of any supplement across all dietary backgrounds (including deficiency and sufficiency) was not demonstrated; therefore, any benefits seen must be balanced against possible risks." The study dismissed the benefits of routinely taking supplements of vitamins C and D, beta-carotene, calcium, and selenium. Results indicated taking niacin may actually be harmful.

In July 2019, another meta-analysis of 24 interventions in 277 trials was conducted and published in Annals of Internal Medicine, including a total of almost 1,000,000 participants. The study generally concluded that the vast majority of multivitamins had no significant effect on survival or heart attack risk. The study found a significant effect on heart health in a low-salt diet, and a small effect due to omega-3 and folic acid supplements. This analysis supports the results of two early 2018 studies that found no conclusive benefits from multivitamins for healthy adults.

=== Expert bodies ===
A 2006 report by the U.S. Agency for Healthcare Research and Quality concluded that "regular supplementation with a single nutrient or a mixture of nutrients for years has no significant benefits in the primary prevention of cancer, cardiovascular disease, cataract, age-related macular degeneration or cognitive decline." However, the report noted that multivitamins have beneficial effects for certain sub-populations, such as people with poor nutritional status, that vitamin D and calcium can help prevent fractures in older people, and that zinc and antioxidants can help prevent age-related macular degeneration in high-risk individuals. A 2017 Cochrane Systematic Review found that multivitamins including vitamin E or beta carotene will not delay the onset of macular degeneration or prevent the disease, however, some people with macular degeneration may benefit from multivitamin supplementation as there is evidence that it may delay the progression of the disease. Including lutein and zeaxanthin supplements in with a multivitamin does not improve progression of macular degeneration. The need for high-quality studies looking at the safety of taking multivitamins has been highlighted.

According to the Harvard School of Public Health: "... many people don't eat the healthiest of diets. That's why a multivitamin can help fill in the gaps, and may have added health benefits." The U.S. Office of Dietary Supplements, a branch of the National Institutes of Health, suggests that multivitamin supplements might be helpful for some people with specific health problems (for example, macular degeneration). However, the Office concluded that "most research shows that healthy people who take an MVM [multivitamin] do not have a lower chance of diseases, such as cancer, heart disease, or diabetes. Based on current research, it's not possible to recommend for or against the use of MVMs to stay healthier longer."

=== Life expectancy ===
A 2024 study of 390,124 healthy adults found that use of multivitamins did not extend life expectancy.

=== History and debate ===
The history of multivitamins begins in the early 20th century when advancements in nutritional science led to the discovery of essential vitamins and minerals. Initially, multivitamins were designed to respond to widespread nutritional deficiencies. These supplements were seen as a practical solution to combat malnutrition, improving public health by providing vital nutrients that were otherwise scarce.

As the 20th century progressed, the use of multivitamins expanded beyond addressing deficiencies. With the rise of the wellness industry, they became popularized as a convenient way to enhance overall health, even for those with access to sufficient nutrition. However, as marketing strategies evolved, the emphasis shifted from necessity to preventative health and general well-being, often without sound scientific backing.

The role of multivitamins has since been increasingly questioned. Some still view them as beneficial, especially in cases of specific deficiencies. A growing body of research suggests that for many people, multivitamins act more as a placebo than a necessary supplement. This indicates a shift in the epistemology of vitamins, where people are generally more aware of them and their properties but there is a gap in their knowledge of the scientific research surrounding them

Studies have shown that multivitamins can have positive effects on mood and energy, but there is little evidence to support an increase in general health and life expectancy.

Under the Dietary Supplement Health and Education Act (DSHEA), passed in 1994 in the United States, the Food and Drug Administration (FDA) is not responsible for testing the risks and efficacy of dietary supplements. Manufacturers are not required to present data on the effectiveness of multivitamins or disclose known side effects to the FDA. Furthermore, manufacturers are not required to test human safety of dietary supplements.

=== Ethnographic research ===
Ethnographic research has investigated possible reasons behind the widespread use of multivitamins in societies where scientific knowledge is dominant, despite the limited empirical evidence supporting new products. The findings reveal various socio-cultural factors contributing to their common use, including:

- Harm reduction: The cultural belief that multivitamins can mitigate risks associated with unhealthy lifestyles, conventional medicines, deficient diets, harmful environmental influences, or genetic predispositions.
- Personal agency: The desire to gain control over one's body and well-being.
- Social proof: The perception of multivitamins' effectiveness based on the experiences and behavior of friends, family and community members.
- Social belonging: Marketing strategies that promote identity-building by targeting specific age groups, genders, or personal interests.
- Biopolitics: The pursuit of productivity and reliability, as framed by capitalist societal expectations.

From anthropological and psychological perspectives, the widespread consumption of multivitamins can be seen as an example of 'magical thinking,' a form of reasoning that seeks to explain phenomena through non-scientific means, distinct from 'irrational thinking'.

=== Autism research ===
Prenatal multivitamin supplementation may be associated with lower risk of autism in children.

== Regulations ==
=== United States ===
The first person to formulate vitamins in the US was Dr. Forrest C. Shaklee. Shaklee introduced a product he dubbed "Shaklee's Vitalized Minerals" in 1915, which he sold until adopting the now ubiquitous term "vitamin" in 1929.

Because of their categorization as a dietary supplement by the Food and Drug Administration (FDA), most multivitamins sold in the U.S. are not required to undergo the testing procedures typical of pharmaceutical drugs.

=== Australia ===
Vitamins are classed as low-risk medications by the Therapeutic Goods Administration (TGA), and are therefore not assessed for efficacy, unlike most medicines sold in Australia. They require that the product is safe and that claims of efficacy can only be made in regards to minor ailments. No claims can be made about serious conditions. The TGA does not examine the contents of the product and whether it is what the label says it is, but they claim to carry out "targeted and random surveillance of products on the market". They encourage people to report any unsafe products to them.

The TGA, however, has been criticized, by people such as Allan Asher, a regulatory expert and former deputy chair of the Australian Competition & Consumer Commission, for allowing more than a thousand types of claim, 86% of which are not supported by scientific evidence, including "softens hardness", "replenishes gate of vitality" and "moistens dryness in the triple burner".

== See also ==
- Dietary supplement
- Essential nutrient
- Food fortification
- Megavitamin therapy
- Prenatal vitamins
