= Aquafresh =

Dental hygiene product

- Logo used since 2012
- Product type: Oral hygiene
- Current owner: Haleon
- Country: United Kingdom
- Introduced: 1973; 53 years ago
- Markets: Worldwide
- Previous owners: Beecham (1973-1989); SmithKline-Beecham (1989-2000); GSK (2000-2022)
- Website: www.aquafresh.com

Aquafresh (originally spelled "Aqua-Fresh") is a British brand of toothpaste and toothbrushes that has been on sale since 1973. It is produced by the health products manufacturer Haleon. One of its characteristics is its striped pattern. Today, the stripes are red, white, and blue (aqua), although initially there were only blue and white stripes.

In 2013 Aquafresh launched the Better Brushing Programme to help promote good oral care habits from an early age including new packaging designs and age-appropriate toothpaste formulations.

In May 2025, Aquafresh launched a new range of toothpaste named White Renew.

== See also ==
- Dental care
- Outline of dentistry and oral health
