= Kenvue =

American consumer health company

Kenvue Inc.
- Type: Private
- Traded as: NYSE: KVUE (2022–2026)
- Industry: Consumer products
- Predecessor: Johnson & Johnson (consumer health division); Pfizer Consumer Health (first incarnation); Pharmacia & Upjohn (consumer health division); Warner–Lambert (consumer health division); Glaxo Wellcome (consumer health division in most territories) (Note: In 1993, Warner Lambert and Wellcome created a joint venture with both companies merging their OTC products into a joint venture, the Wellcome OTC brands such as Calpol and Actifed, Glaxo also made a agreement with Warner Lambert in 1994 for the distribution of Zantac. In 1995, Glaxo and Wellcome merged to form Glaxo Wellcome which saw its OTC joint venture with Warner Lambert to now include Calpol, Actifed, and Zantac. In 1996, Warner Lambert bought out Glaxo Wellcome's stake in the joint venture, this caused Calpol, Actifed, and Zantac to be owned by Warner Lambert in most countries, however Glaxo Wellcome retained their OTC division in select countries such as the Philippines, Indonesia and South Africa. In 2000, Glaxo Wellcome and SmithKline Beecham merged to form GSK, in some countries where Glaxo Wellcome retained their OTC division, the remaining OTC division of Glaxo Wellcome also merged with SmithKline Beecham's OTC, also in 2000, Warner Lambert gets bought by Pfizer, which later sold their first healthcare division to Johnson and Johnson in 2006. Which is why in most countries, a brand such as Calpol is owned by Kenvue and Kimberly-Clark rather than Haleon)
- Founded: February 23, 2022; 4 years ago
- Headquarters: Summit, New Jersey, U.S.
- Area served: Worldwide
- Key people: Kirk Perry (CEO); Larry Merlo (chairman)
- Products: Aveeno; Band-Aid; Benadryl; Johnson's Baby; Listerine; Lactaid; Mylanta; Neutrogena; Trosyd; Calpol; Tylenol; Visine
- Revenue: ▼US$15.1 billion (2025)
- Operating income: ▲US$2.41 billion (2025)
- Net income: ▲US$1.47 billion (2025)
- Total assets: ▲US$27.1 billion (2025)
- Total equity: ▲US$10.8 billion (2025)
- Owner: Kimberly-Clark
- Number of employees: c. 22,000 (2025)
- Subsidiaries: McNeil Consumer Healthcare
- Website: kenvue.com

Kenvue Inc. is an American consumer health company. Formerly the Consumer Healthcare division of Johnson & Johnson, Kenvue owns well-known brands such as Aveeno, Band-Aid, Benadryl, Zyrtec, Johnson's, Listerine, Lactaid, Mylanta, Neutrogena, Trosyd, Calpol, Tylenol, and Visine. Kenvue is incorporated in Delaware and was originally headquartered in the Skillman section of Montgomery Township, New Jersey, before relocating to Summit, New Jersey.

Johnson & Johnson announced in November 2021 that it would spin off its consumer health division as a separate company. The new company was named Kenvue in September 2022, and its initial public offering took place in May 2023, raising $3.8 billion in the largest U.S. IPO since 2021, with an initial valuation of about $41 billion. Johnson & Johnson initially retained more than 90% ownership before completing a full separation through a share exchange in July 2023. Kenvue was subsequently added to the S&P 500 Dividend Aristocrats index.

CEO Thibaut Mongon initially led Kenvue, which employed about 22,200 people in 2022. Following Mongon’s termination in 2025, Kirk Perry was named interim CEO. Perry was appointed the company's permanent CEO in November 2025.

The company has also faced controversy, including a securities class action filed in 2023 alleging misleading disclosures regarding risks related to phenylephrine, which led to its stock trading below IPO levels.

On November 3, 2025, Kimberly-Clark announced that it was acquiring Kenvue for a total enterprise value of US$48.7 billion. The acquisition was completed on November 2, 2026.

== History ==
=== Spin-off and IPO ===
On November 12, 2021, Johnson & Johnson announced that it would spin off its consumer health division as a separate company in an effort to streamline operations. The new company would assume well-known consumer brands such as Aveeno, Band-Aid, Neutrogena, and Tylenol, while Johnson & Johnson would focus on the pharmaceutical and medical device sectors. CEO Alex Gorsky said that the split was in response to "a significant evolution in these markets, particularly on the consumer side", and would enable faster expansion for both businesses.

Other pharmaceutical companies that made similar moves around this time included Merck & Co., which sold its consumer health business to Bayer in 2014, (Note: Merck & Co. sold their consumer healthcare stake (which included Pepcid, Mylanta, and Mylicon) to Johnson & Johnson. However it is different from the Pfizer Consumer healthcare acquisition because Merck & Co entered a joint venture with Johnson & Johnson, this joint venture actually handled the OTC product lines which was mentioned earlier, the reason why they sold their stake of this consumer products joint venture is to actually focus on their other consumer healthcare which they acquired from Schering-Plough. They later sold their consumer healthcare division to Bayer.) and Pfizer, which merged its consumer health division with that of GSK plc in 2019. (Note: Pfizer had previously sold its consumer health division (which had included in its portfolio such brands as Listerine, Benadryl, Visine, Combantrin, Mylanta, Nicorette, Sudafed, Rogaine, Rolaids, and Zantac) to Johnson & Johnson in 2006, but re-entered the consumer health industry when it acquired Wyeth (whose consumer health division had included in its portfolio such brands as Advil, Centrum, ChapStick, Dimetapp, and Robitussin) in 2009. It later sold their consumer health division again to GSK plc. Then was spun off to create Haleon.) The November 2021 announcement also occurred the same week that General Electric and Toshiba each announced that they would split into multiple entities.

The New York Times noted that Johnson & Johnson had long benefited from a "halo effect," namely a lingering positive connotation ascribed to the company name stemming from its popular household brands such as Johnson's Baby, but that its reputation had declined as a result of various controversies in recent years; Johnson & Johnson was the subject of litigation over its role in the opioid epidemic in the United States, as well as over allegations that its talc-based baby powder contained asbestos and caused ovarian cancer for some consumers. The spin-off was seen as an effort to move past these controversies and assuage shareholder apprehension.

The Times also pointed out that, while the consumer health business operates many well-known brands, it was not nearly as lucrative as the pharmaceutical and medical device sectors, taking $15 billion in revenue in 2021 compared to the latter's combined $77 billion, and commented that the popularity of the consumer brands "does not do much to advance Johnson & Johnson's medical businesses, which are far more important to the company's finances".

On February 23, 2022, the consumer health business was registered as a corporation in Delaware, under the provisional name JNTL, Inc. On September 28, 2022, Johnson & Johnson said that the new consumer health company would be called Kenvue, a combination of "ken", a Scottish English word for 'knowledge', and "vue", a homophone of "view" intended to evoke the concept of 'sight'. At the time, Kenvue's total number of employees was about 22,000.

In January 2023, Kenvue filed with the U.S. Securities and Exchange Commission for an initial public offering (IPO). Kenvue issued about 1.89 billion shares, of which about 170 million were to be offered at the IPO. This meant that after the IPO, Johnson & Johnson would retain almost 91 percent of the shares.

The IPO took place on May 4, 2023. Shares of Kenvue were priced at $22, implying an initial equity valuation for Kenvue of about $41 billion, and traded at $26.90 at the end of the first trading day. Raising about $3.8 billion in capital for Kenvue, it was the largest IPO since the IPO of Rivian on November 10, 2021. The IPO was seen as a useful gauge of broader investor confidence. Observers cited rising interest rates and predictions of a looming recession to explain the slowdown in the U.S. IPO market since 2022 and said that Kenvue was an "idiosyncratic" IPO candidate as it was well-established, with an extensive track record of profitable years under its parent company.

On July 24, 2023, Johnson & Johnson launched an exchange offer to split off Kenvue, allowing Johnson & Johnson shareholders to exchange all, some, or none of their shares of Johnson & Johnson common stock for shares of Kenvue.

In August 2023, Kenvue was added to the S&P 500 Dividend Aristocrats index.

In March 2025, following the purchase of a stake in the company by activist investment firm Starboard, Jeffrey Smith, the CEO, took a seat on Kenvue’s board of directors. In July 2025, Thibaut Mongon, the first CEO of Kenvue, was terminated, and a review of the company’s strategy was begun.

=== Acquisition by Kimberly-Clark ===
In November 2025, Kimberly-Clark, a consumer products giant whose brands include Kleenex, Kotex, Huggies and Softex, agreed to spend about $40 billion to acquire Kenvue. In terms of sales, the two companies had been roughly equal—in 2024, Kimberly-Clark had revenue of about $20.1 billion, while Kenvue's revenue was about $15.5 billion. The cash-and-stock deal will result in Kimberly-Clark shareholders owning about 54 percent of the new, combined company, with Kenvue shareholders owning about 46 percent.

== Brands ==
Consumer brands operated by Kenvue include the following:

- Aveeno
- Band-Aid
- Benadryl
- Benylin
- Calpol
- Carefree (outside the U.S.)
- Clean & Clear
- Imodium
- Johnson's Baby
- Le Petit Marseillais
- Listerine
- Lubriderm
- Motrin
- Neosporin
- Neutrogena
- Nicorette
- Pepcid
- Rogaine
- Sudafed
- Trosyd
- Tylenol
- Visine
- Zyrtec
- Vania

== Controversy ==
A securities class action was initiated in the United States District Court of New Jersey by law firm Kessler Topaz Meltzer & Check LLP on 9 October 2023. The action alleged that Kenvue was in violation of federal securities laws, alleging fraudulent and misleading statements, including omissions, about the company's internal control and financial reporting. This was specifically in relation to Kenvue's Registration Statement, which is said not to have disclosed information pertaining to possible risks and potential litigation regarding phenylephrine, its uses, and its efficacy. As a result, investors were informed of the lawsuit and noted significant losses. Kenvue shares closed at 9.6% below the IPO price, at $19.87.
