= Serena Kerrigan =

Social media influencer

Serena Kerrigan is a social media influencer, creator and star of Peacock TV show Older Hotter Wiser, creator of the card game Let's Fucking Date, and author of forthcoming Random House book entitled Let's Fcking Date. Her nickname is the Queen of Confidence. Major themes in her work are dating, increasing your confidence, and becoming the main character in your own life.

== Early life and education ==
Kerrigan attended Duke University. While there, she began to go by SFK, which stood for Serena Fucking Kerrigan. She started her career as a video producer at Refinery29. In 2022, she left her job to dedicate herself full time to building the SFK brand.

== Career ==
During the COVID-19 Pandemic, Kerrigan launched an Instagram Live TV show in her living room in which she broadcast herself going on dates via video chat. The show went viral and landed a sponsorship deal with Bumble.

One of Kerrigan's first major business ventures was the card game Let's Fucking Date. She gained notoriety when she attempted to give Taylor Swift the card game upon seeing her at a restaurant. The singer declined the gift.

In 2025, Kerrigan created and starred in Older Hotter Wiser, a show released on Peacock. Kerrigan also released her first book in partnership with Neutrogena, a two-part short story series called Release Your Glow.

In Fall 2026, Kerrigan is scheduled to release her dating advice book Let's Fucking Date.

== Personal life ==
Kerrigan's boyfriend is Felix Levine, host of the podcast Unlike Me. Kerrigan met Levine when he interviewed her on his podcast. Levine co-starred in Older Hotter Wiser.
