= List of paracetamol brand names =

The medication paracetamol (INN) (/ˌpærəˈsiːtəmɒl/ or /ˌpærəˈsɛtəmɒl/), also known as acetaminophen (USAN) (/əˌsiːtəˈmɪnəfɪn/), is sold around the world under a number of different brand names. Common brand names include Tylenol, Excedrin, Calpol, and Panadol.

== Tylenol ==
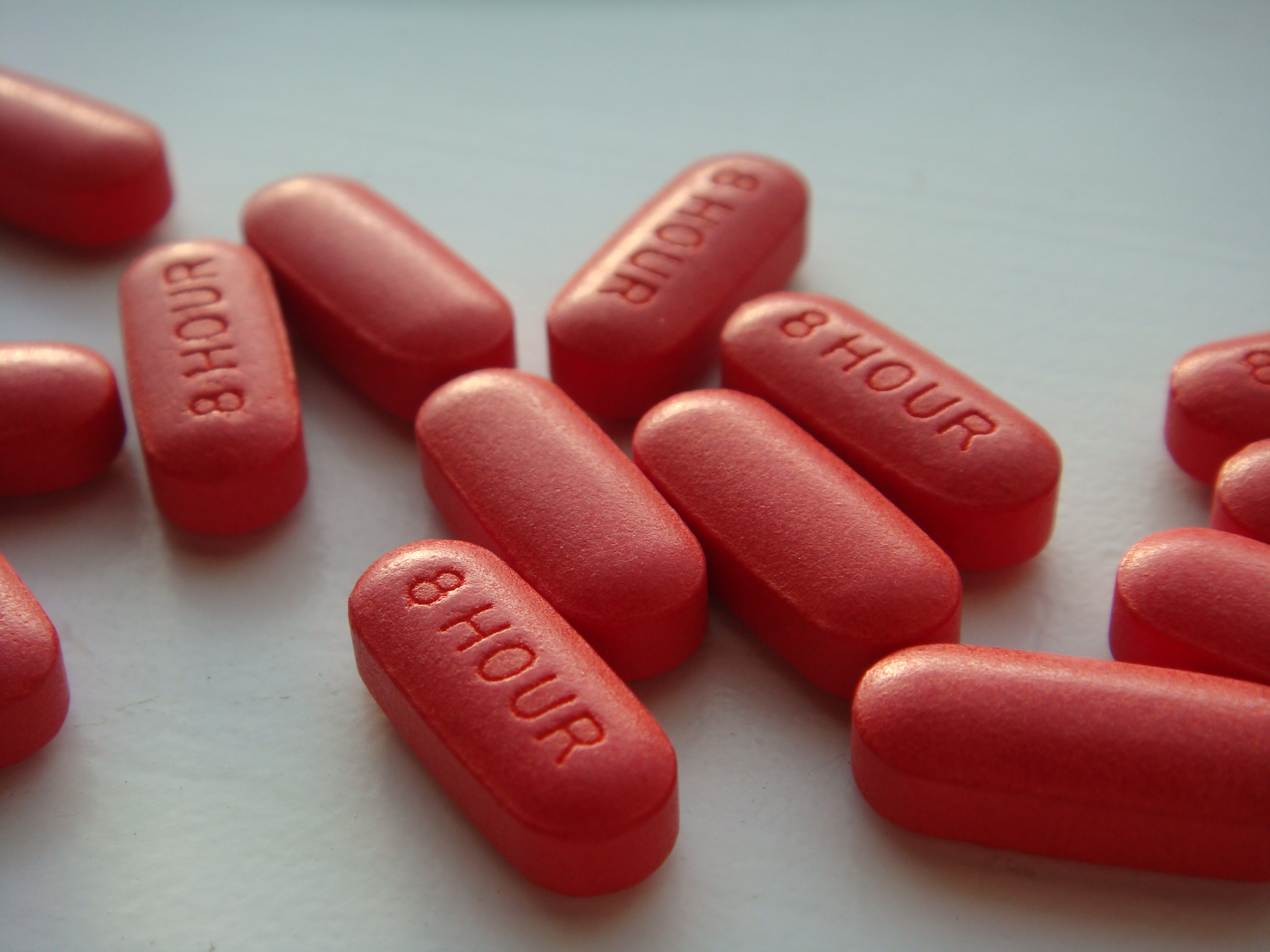
Tylenol 8-hour pills

Tylenol is a brand of drugs advertised for reducing pain, reducing fever, and relieving the symptoms of allergies, cold, cough headache, and influenza. The active ingredient of its original flagship product is paracetamol. The brand name "Tylenol" is owned by Kenvue. As of 2017 the brand was used in Brazil, Canada, China, Egypt, Lebanon, Myanmar, Oman, Philippines, Switzerland, Thailand, the United States, and Vietnam.

== Calpol ==
Calpol is a brand of children's medicine sold in the United Kingdom, Republic of Ireland, India, Cyprus, Hong Kong, Kenya, Malta, Philippines and Turkey. The main product is a paracetamol suspension, branded as Calpol Infant Suspension. It is usually a coloured syrup with a sweet taste, and is used to treat fever and pain. In 2016 it was the second biggest selling branded over-the-counter medication sold in Great Britain, with sales of £66.3 million.

Calpol also comes in a form containing ibuprofen, marketed under the name Calprofen. Calpol Night, a product containing paracetamol and an antihistamine, was listed for use from 2+ months. However, this was changed and it is now only considered suitable for children over the age of 6 years.

=== History ===
Calpol was launched in 1959 by English pharmaceutical company, Calmic Ltd, based in Crewe, Cheshire; the company's name was an abbreviation of Cheshire and Lancashire Medical Industries Corporation, which moved from Lancashire to Crewe Hall in 1947. The Calpol brand name is likely a combination of 'Calmic' and 'paracetamol'. Calmic was acquired by Wellcome (today GlaxoSmithKline) in 1966, and Calpol became one of Wellcome's best-selling UK products in the 1980s. The brand was later owned by Pfizer Consumer Healthcare, which was acquired by Johnson & Johnson in 2006. Calpol is today a brand of Johnson & Johnson's McNeil Consumer Healthcare subsidiary; in 2020, Calpol was the UK's top-selling paediatric analgesic product with sales worth £60.1 million.

== Panadol ==
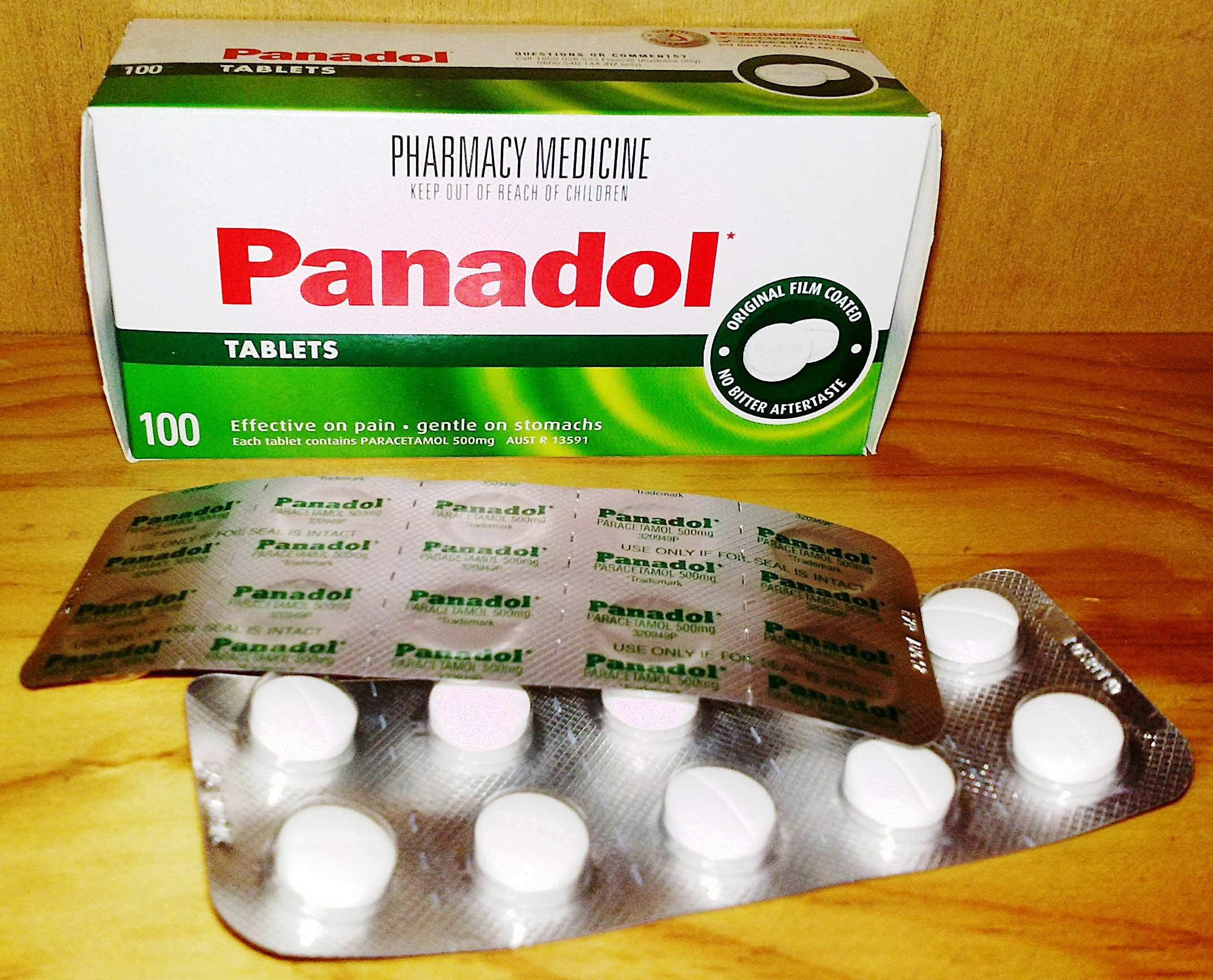
Panadol 500 mg tablets

Panadol is one of Haleon's trade names for paracetamol or acetaminophen. According to Haleon, Panadol is marketed in 85 countries, including Australia, Bahrain, Barbados, Belgium, Brazil, Bulgaria, Chile, Egypt, Finland, France, Greece, Honduras, Hong Kong, Indonesia, Ireland, Italy, Kenya, Korea, Lebanon, Macau, Malaysia, Netherlands, New Zealand, Nigeria, the Philippines, Peru, Puerto Rico, Pakistan, Qatar, Romania, Saudi Arabia, Singapore, South Africa, Sri Lanka, Switzerland, Taiwan, Thailand, Trinidad and Tobago, Turkey, the United Arab Emirates, the United Kingdom, Vietnam, Malta, Uruguay, North Korea and Oman.

=== History ===
After it was first introduced only in clinics in 1953, Panadol started its commercial business in 1955 by Phillips, Scott & Turner, which was acquired by Frederick Stearns & Co, a subsidiary of Sterling Drug Inc. It was advertised as being "gentle on the stomach", since other analgesic agents at the time contained aspirin, a known stomach irritant. In 1955, Panadol was introduced to hospitals in the United Kingdom. Panadol was originally available only by prescription in the UK, but is now available over the counter. In 1983, Sterling introduced Panadol to the United States market. In 1988 Sterling Winthrop was acquired by Eastman Kodak which sold the worldwide over the counter drug business to SmithKline Beecham in 1994. Two weeks later, SmithKline Beecham sold the over-the-counter medication business in the United States, Canada and Puerto Rico to Bayer for US$1 billion. However, North American rights to Panadol were retained by SmithKline. It has been called "one of the most-frequently counterfeited medicines in the world."

=== Other formulations and packaging ===
Panadol is sold in different formulations and packaging with different names.

Panadol Extra, an S2 pharmacy-only medicine in Australia, combines 65 mg of caffeine with 500 mg of paracetamol per tablet. Caffeine may improve the analgesic effect of paracetamol. Studies have reached conflicting conclusions regarding the clinical significance of this incremental pain relief.

Panadol Osteo and Panadol Extend Tablets are modified-release formulations of paracetamol. Panadol Osteo is marketed in Australia and New Zealand; its immediate to sustained release ratio is 33% to 66%.

Panadol Rapid Handipak is Panadol Rapid packaged in a slim container of ten 500 mg caplets, designed to appeal to Australian women who are 20 to 35 years of age.

Panadol Cold and Catarrh contains three active ingredients: paracetamol, phenylephrine hydrochloride as a nasal decongestant, and chlorpheniramine maleate to prevent certain allergies.

Panadol Cold and Flu and Panadol Fever and Congestion both combine paracetamol with phenylephrine hydrochloride as a nasal decongestant.

== Other brand names ==
Common brand names include:
Brand name	Countries
Acamol	Chile, Israel, Kenya
Ace	Bangladesh, Kenya
Acet	Canada, Philippines, Singapore
Acetalgin	Switzerland
Adol	Egypt, Kenya, Kuwait, Lebanon, Oman, Tunisia, United Arab Emirates
Aeknil	India, Philippines
Alvedon	Sweden, Philippines
Apap	Poland
Apiretal	Paraguay, Spain
Atamel	Venezuela
Atasol	Canada
Ben-u-ron	Portugal
Biogesic	Hong Kong, Indonesia, Myanmar, Philippines, Singapore
Buscapina	Argentina, Paraguay, Costa Rica, Guatemala, Honduras, Nicaragua, Panama, El Salvador, Uruguay, Peru, Mexico
Caffetin	Bosnia & Herzegovina, Bulgaria, Croatia, Georgia, Romania, Russian Federation, North Macedonia, Servia, Slovenia
Calonal	Japan
Calpol	Cyprus, India, Ireland, Kuwait, Lithuania, Malta, Oman, Pakistan, Philippines, Poland, Singapore, South Africa, Turkey, United Kingdom
Cemol	Thailand, Philippines
Centamol	Bangladesh
Cetamol	Egypt, Oman, Nepal, Tunisia, Thailand
Co-Tipol	Malta
Coldex	Egypt, Israel, Tunisia
Coldrex	Bosnia & Herzegovina, Bulgaria, China, Croatia, Czech Republic, Estonia, Georgia, Hungary, Lithuania, New Zealand, North Macedonia, Pakistan, Poland, Romania, Serbia, Slovakia
Cotibin	Chile
Crocin	India
Dafalgan	Belgium, Egypt, France, Kuwait, Lebanon, Luxembourg, Morocco, Portugal, Switzerland
Daleron	Bosnia-Herzegovina, Bulgaria, Croatia, Latvia, Lithuania, Malta, North Macedonia, Romania, Slovenia
Depon	Cyprus, Greece
Dexamol	Israel
Dolex	Colombia, Pakistan, Uruguay
Doliprane	Algeria, France, India, Lebanon, Morocco, Tunisia
Dolo	India
Dumin	Indonesia
Efferalgan	Bulgaria, Croatia, Egypt, Estonia, France, Georgia, Italy, Kuwait, Latvia, Lebanon, Lithuania, North Macedonia, Pakistan, Poland, Portugal, Romania, Serbia, Spain, Tunisia
Enelfa	Germany, Luxembourg, Malta, Oman
Europain	Hong Kong
Excedrin	France, Georgia, Greece, Ireland, Israel, Kuwait, Netherlands, Oman, Peru, Portugal, Turkey, United States
Febrectal	Spain
Febricet	Bosnia & Herzegovina, North Macedonia, Serbia
Febridol	Australia
Fenmol	Pakistan
Fep	India
Fepamol	India
Fervex	Bulgaria, Estonia, France, Georgia, Lithuania, North Macedonia, Romania, Serbia, Tunisia
Fevadol	Kuwait, Oman, Pakistan
Gelocatil	Spain
Gelonida	Germany
Gesic	Bangladesh
Gripex	Bulgaria, Lithuania, Poland, Tunisia
Gripin	Paraguay, Turkey
Grippostad	Austria, Bosnia-Herzegovina, Bulgaria, Croatia, Czech Republic, Egypt, Estonia, Hungary, Latvia, Lithuania, Romania, Russian Federation, Serbia, Slovakia, Spain
Hecamol	Taiwan
Hedex	Bangladesh, Ireland, United Kingdom
Hepa	Bangladesh
Hipa	Bangladesh
Ilvico	Portugal, Spain
Influbene	Austria, Bulgaria, Romania
Ipramol	Pakistan
Kafa	Switzerland
Kitadol	Chile, Paraguay, Peru, Uruguay
Kodone	Guatemala
Lekadol	Bosnia & Herzegovina, Bulgaria, Croatia, North Macedonia, Romania, Slovenia
Lupocet	Bosnia & Herzegovina, Croatia
Mexalen	Austria, Hungary
Migraleve	Ireland, Israel, Malta, Portugal, United Kingdom
Minamol	Turkey
Minoset	Turkey
Nalsarac	Vietnam
Napa	Bangladesh, Pakistan, Singapore
Napadol	Bangladesh
Neo-Percodan	Mexico
Neopap	United States
Nikold	Georgia
PainQuil	United States
Pamol	Denmark, Estonia, Finland, Indonesia, Lithuania, New Zealand, Sweden
Panado	South Africa
Panadol	Australia, Bangladesh, Belgium, Bosnia-Herzegovina, Bulgaria, Chile, China, Croatia, Cyprus, Czech Republic, Ecuador, Egypt, Estonia, Finland, France, Georgia, Greece, Hong Kong, Hungary, Indonesia, Ireland, Israel, Italy, Kuwait, Latvia, Lebanon, Lithuania, Luxembourg, Malaysia, Malta, Myanmar, Netherlands, New Zealand, North Macedonia, Oman, Peru, Philippines, Poland, Portugal, Romania, Serbia, Singapore, Slovakia, Spain, Sri Lanka, Switzerland, Taiwan, Thailand, Tunisia, Turkey, United Arab Emirates, United Kingdom
Panamax	Australia, Taiwan
Panda	Jordan, Oman
Panodil	Denmark, Iceland, Norway, Sweden
Panoxen	Russian Federation
Panreliv	Philippines
Paracet	Bosnia & Herzegovina, Iceland, Israel, Norway, Turkey
Paralen	Bosnia & Herzegovina, Bulgaria, Croatia, Czech Republic, Lithuania, North Macedonia, Norway, Poland, Serbia, Slovakia,
Paramax	Czech Republic, Estonia, Hungary, Ireland, Latvia, Norway, Philippines, Poland, Slovakia, United Kingdom, Finland
Paramed	Tunisia
Paramol	Egypt, Israel, Kuwait, Paraguay, Romania, Taiwan, Thailand, United Kingdom
Paratabs	Iceland
Parol	Turkey, Georgia
Perdolan	Belgium, Luxembourg
Perfalgan	Austria, Egypt, Estonia, France, Germany, India, Ireland, Israel, Italy, Lithuania, Malta, New Zealand, Oman, Romania, South Africa, Spain, Switzerland, Tunisia, Turkey, United Kingdom
Pinex	Denmark, Iceland, Netherlands, Norway, Sweden
Plicet	Croatia, North Macedonia
Pyrenol	Bangladesh
Pyrigesic	India
Revanin	Kuwait, Oman
Rubophen	Hungary
Sanipirina	Italy
Sanmol	Indonesia
Santa Cold	Georgia
Saridon	Brazil, Bulgaria, China, Czech Republic, Hungary, Indonesia, Italy, Kuwait, Latvia, Lithuania, Netherlands, Oman, Philippines, Portugal, Romania, Spain
Sumagesic	Indonesia
Tachipirin	Venezuela
Tachipirina	Italy
Tafirol	Argentina, Mexico, Paraguay
Tapsin	Chile, Peru
Tempra	Canada, Ecuador, Egypt, Indonesia, Kuwait, Lebanon, Mexico, Philippines, Venezuela
Termalgin	Spain
Termorex	Indonesia
Thomapyrin	Austria, Croatia, Germany, Turkey
Tipol	Malta
Triaminic	Italy
Tylenol	Brazil, Canada, China, Egypt, Kuwait, Lebanon, Lithuania, Mexico, Myanmar, Netherlands, Oman, Paraguay, Philippines, South Africa, Switzerland, Thailand, United States, Uruguay, Venezuela
Ultracet	Brazil, China, Hong Kong, Indonesia, Malaysia, Myanmar, Singapore, South Africa, Taiwan, Thailand, United States, Venezuela
Uphamol	Malaysia
Valadol	United States
Vermidon	Turkey
Xumadol	Chile, Peru, Portugal, Spain
Zolben	Chile, Switzerland, Uruguay
