= Clean & Clear =

American brand of dermatology products

- Product type: Skin care products
- Current owner: Kenvue
- Country: United States
- Introduced: 1956; 70 years ago
- Related brands: Neutrogena
- Markets: 46 countries
- Previous owners: Revlon; Johnson & Johnson
- Tagline: "Clean & Clear and under control"
- Website: www.cleanandclear.com

Clean & Clear is an American brand of dermatology products owned by Kenvue.

Most products aim towards young women and men, but some treat a wider range of conditions, such as the "SOFT" line. Clean & Clear is currently available in 46 countries.

== History ==
The first Clean & Clear product was a skin cleanser. Revlon introduced lotions and bar soap by 1986, and hair conditioner and shampoo by 1989.

The brand was originally developed by Revlon as a line of sensitive skin personal care items and was introduced by 1956. The Clean & Clear name referred to the fact that the products contained no fragrance or dyes, and left no residue after rinsing. The original line featured shampoos, conditioners and facial skincare products. In 1991, Revlon sold Clean & Clear to Johnson & Johnson.

=== Advertising and partnerships ===
In 1993, Clean & Clear adopted its current slogan, "Clean & Clear and Under Control". Johnson & Johnson re-positioned Clean & Clear within the market, focusing on acne. In 2000, Johnson & Johnson used the brand to experiment with online marketing, using the Clean & Clear Talking Postcard Superstitial campaign to develop a presence in online teen communities. The campaign won at the Massachusetts Interactive Media Council Awards in the online advertising category.

In 2010, Clean & Clear ventured into celebrity and charity partnership strategies with the Do Something nonprofit organization and star Demi Lovato, launching the program "Join the Surge". In 2011, Clean & Clear began a partnership with the United Nations Foundation's Girl Up campaign, cosponsoring a "Unite for Girls" tour with Lily Halpern and a fundraising promotion at Target stores.

The brand made its first social gaming tie-in with a 2012 promotion on The Sims Social.

On March 14, 2015, Johnson & Johnson announced a deal for Jazz Jennings to appear in Clean & Clear commercials.

== Product ranges ==
=== Morning Burst ===
In 2004 the brand departed from the anti-acne market in launching Morning Burst Facial Cleanser, a general facial cleanser with vitamin C. Nora Zehetner was the line's initial spokesperson. In 2011 the Morning Burst line expanded to include body washes. In 2014, Morning Burst cleansers were among the top 20 leading skin care brands in the U.S., with a market share of 4.5%.

=== Advantage ===
Johnson & Johnson launched Clean & Clear Advantage in the 2000s as an anti-acne line. It includes cleansers, scrubs and moisturizers. According to Symphony IRI data cited by Household and Personal Products Industry magazine in 2012, the Advantage line series was among top ten acne treatment solutions on the US market, with 4% market share.

Clean & Clear Advantage Control Kit was named "Best Acne Regimen" by InStyle magazine in 2008. In 2007, Advantage Acne Spot Treatment won the Glam.com Beauty Award as the readers' choice for "Blemish Treatment". It also won Allure magazine's Best of Beauty award in 2011 and 2012. In 2013, Advantage Oil Absorbing Cream Cleanser won Allure magazine's Best of Beauty award.

== Health issues ==
In 2013 several Clean & Clear products were criticized for containing small polyethylene microbeads, which are potentially harmful for marine fauna and human health. These particles were present in Advantage 3 in 1 facial scrub, Blackhead Eraser scrub and Deep Action Exfoliating Scrub. Replying to 5 Gyres' request to remove microbeads from its products, Johnson & Johnson began to phase out polyethylene microbeads in Summer 2013. The company later promised to completely remove all microbeads from its products by the end of 2015.

In June 2014 The U.S. Food and Drug Administration mentioned Clean & Clear (among other over-the-counter topical acne products) in a special safety announcement on products that might cause "rare but serious hypersensitivity reactions".
