= Johnson's Baby =

American cosmetics brand

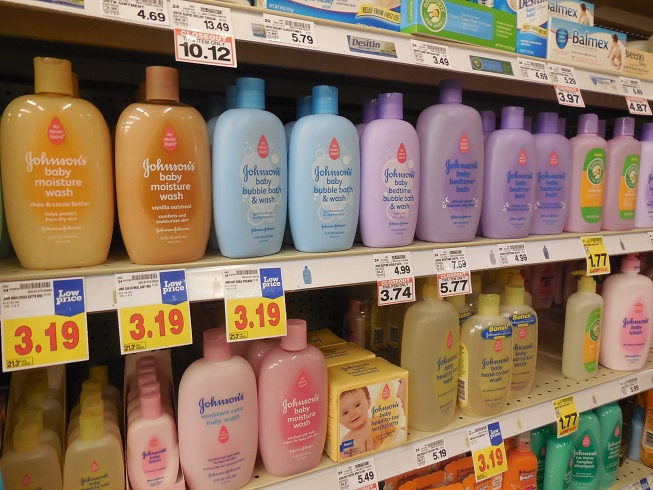
- Johnson's Baby products at a Kroger store
- Product type: Baby powder; Shampoos; Body lotion; Massage oil; Shower gels; Baby wipes
- Current owner: Kenvue
- Country: United States
- Introduced: 1893; 133 years ago
- Markets: Worldwide (more than 175 countries)
- Previous owners: Johnson & Johnson
- Ambassador: Parineeti Chopra
- Tagline: "Choose Gentle"
- Website: johnsonsbaby.com

Johnson's Baby is an American brand of baby cosmetics and skin care products owned by Kenvue. The brand was introduced in 1893 with Johnson's Baby Powder. The product line consists of baby powder, shampoos, body lotions, massage oil, shower gels and baby wipes.

== History ==
=== Johnson's Baby Powder and sanitary napkins (1893) ===
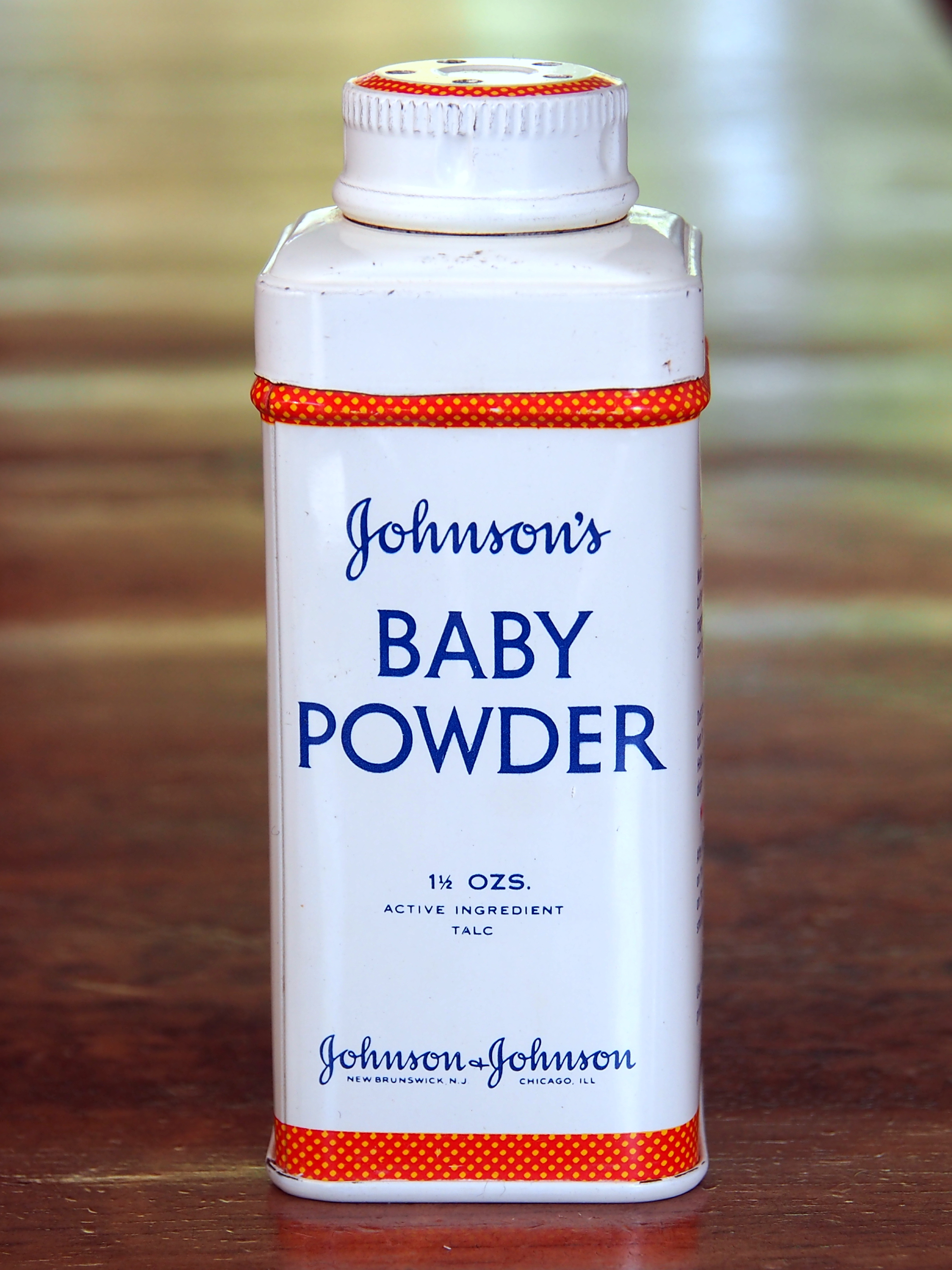
Johnson's Baby Powder (50s)

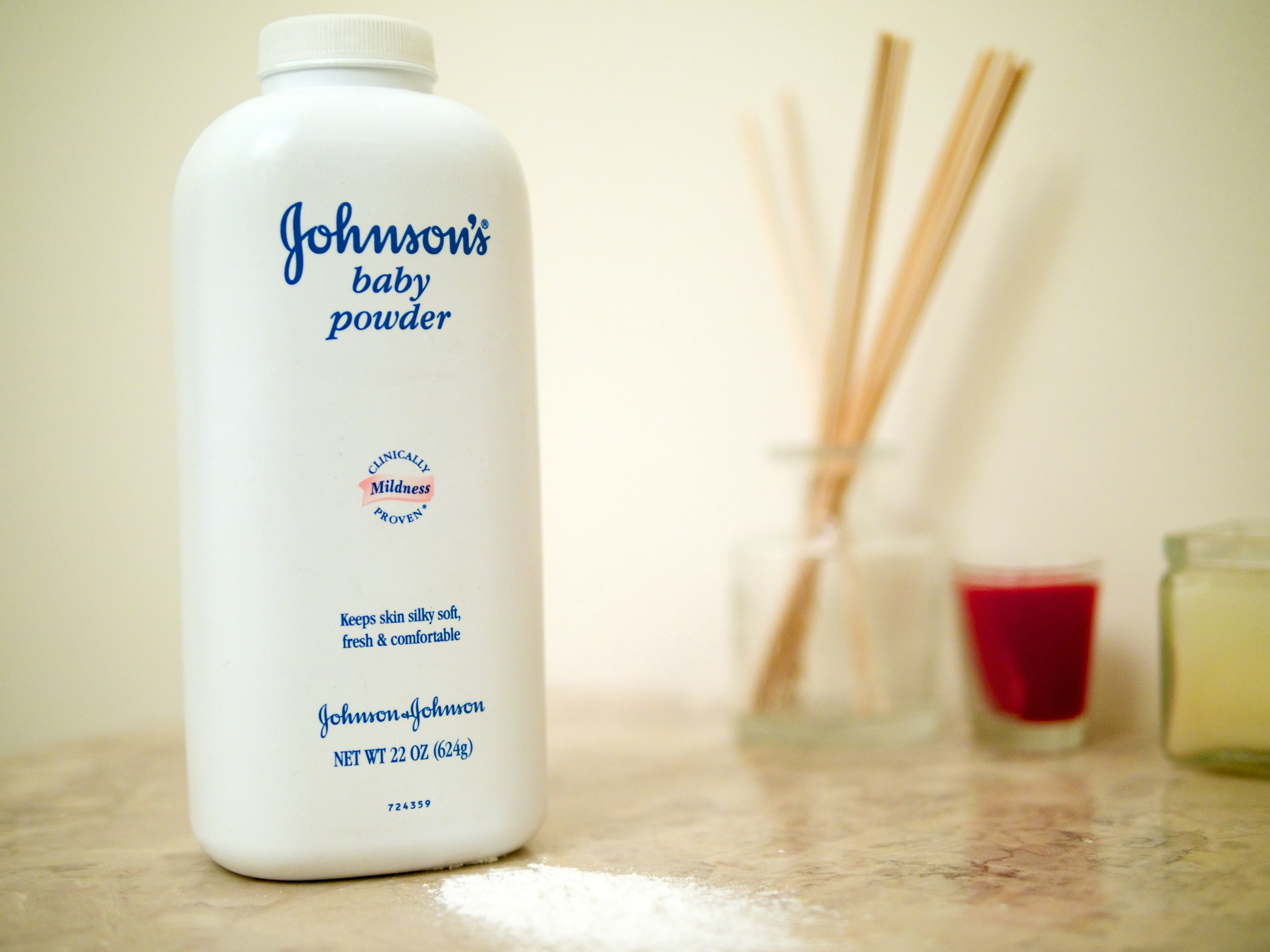
Johnson's Baby Powder (2014)

Johnson's Baby Powder was an invention of Dr. Frederick B. Kilmer, the company's first director of scientific affairs. In 1892, he responded to a letter from a physician about a patient suffering skin irritations after using medicated plasters. Kilmer suggested to use scented Italian talcum powder to mitigate the irritation and sent a can to the doctor.

Baby Powder debuted in 1893 and went to the market in 1894. The earliest Baby Powder was in a yellow and red tin with a label "For Toilet and Nursery”.

According to Robert Shook, sanitary napkins were included in the young mother's kit but never considered a separate product until customers asked the company for it.

In 1893 the talc was packaged in a box that was originally distributed to midwives and given to mothers following childbirth... Also in the midwife's box were twelve sanitary napkins. Prior to this, there was no such product available to purchase... the company started to manufacture them – the first company to make sanitary napkins in the United States.

The first baby to appear on Johnson's Baby Powder label was Mary Lea Johnson Richards, granddaughter of Robert Wood Johnson I (co-founder of Johnson & Johnson).

According to Johnson & Johnson's representative Fred Tewell, baby powder-scented cleaning products became almost a standard not only to cosmetics, but to diapers as well.

==== Discontinuation ====
Johnson & Johnson issued a recall of its Baby Powder in October 2019 after the United States Food and Drug Administration discovered trace amounts of asbestos in a bottle. After over 100 years, the company announced on May 20, 2020 that its talc-based Baby Powder would be discontinued in the United States and Canada, following declining sales and backlash from recent lawsuits over allegations that the product contained asbestos, which can cause cancer. However, cornstarch-based Baby Powder continues to be sold in both the United States and Canada.

On October 15, 2021, Johnson & Johnson put its talc liabilities into Chapter 11 bankruptcy in the United States.

On April 4, 2023, J&J's talc liabilities once again filed for bankruptcy.

==== Reformulation ====
The original product, Johnson's Baby Powder, has been discontinued. Johnson's Baby currently offers baby powder products based on a different formula made from cornstarch. One of these, Johnson's Cornstarch Baby Powder with Aloe and Vitamin E, is recommended by the Johnson's Baby website as a suitable alternative to the discontinued Johnson's Baby Powder.

=== Johnson's Baby Cream (1921) ===
Johnson's Baby Cream was introduced in 1921.

=== The Gift Box (1921) ===
According to Margaret Gurowitz, Johnson & Johnson's corporate historian, in 1921 the company released its first "Baby Gift Box" that contained small packages of Baby Powder, Baby Cream and Baby Soap and "was designed as a small gift that people could take when visiting a family with a new baby".

=== Johnson's Baby oil (1938) ===
Introduced in 1938 Johnson's Baby massage oil was heavily advertised nationwide in Life magazine since 1943 as a complementary product to Baby Powder.

=== Johnson's Baby Lotion (1942) ===
Often referred as the "Pink Brand" (after the color of the bottle), Johnson's Baby Lotion appeared in 1942.

=== Johnson's Baby Shampoo (1953) ===
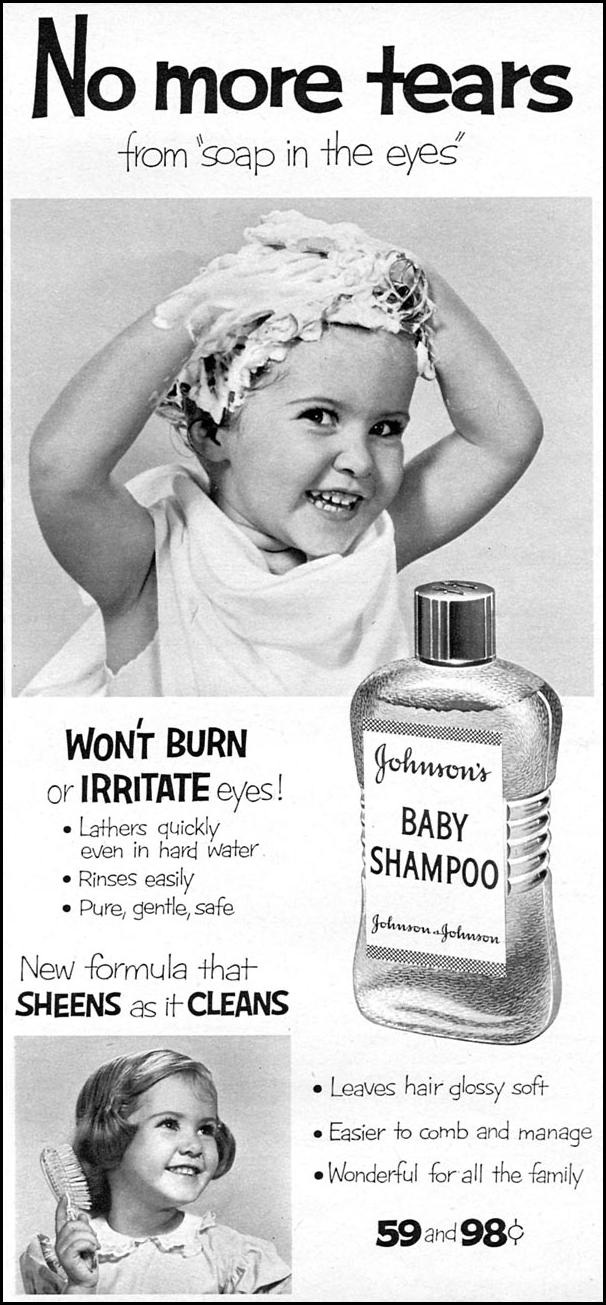
"No More Tears" Johnson's Baby shampoo advertising from the "Family Circle" magazine (1956)

"No More Tears" shampoo was introduced in 1953.

Nunes and Johnson wrote:

In 1953 Johnson & Johnson introduced its No More Tears baby shampoo... with the company introducing amphoteric cleansing agents to consumer use. Though these agents are not as effective as traditional soaps, they are extremely mild, which makes them quite literally easy on the eyes and perfect for a baby's sensitive but presumably not-too-dirty skin... Within six months of its introduction, Johnson & Johnson had captured 75 percent of the baby shampoo market, a share it held as recently as 1995.

In 1955 Johnson & Johnson placed advertising at the "Adventures of Robin Hood TV series for Band-Aid and Johnson's baby shampoo. The latter was advertised with the tagline "Johnson's can't burn eyes".

"No More Tears" has been registered as a trademark only since 1959.

A persistent myth holds that this should in fact be read as "no more tears (/tɛə/)", in the sense meaning a rip in hair, but the correct reading is in fact "no more tears (/tɪə/)" in the sense of ocular secretion, in this case meaning it does not sting eyes if a small amount accidentally enters them, due to the molecular structure of the formula.

The company also made changes to their entire range of products, eliminating ingredients like formaldehyde, parabens, triclosan and phthalates from all baby products.

=== No More Tangles (1971) ===
"No More Tangles" kids shampoo (named after popular "No More Tears" shampoo) debuted in 1971.

=== Book publishing (1976) ===
In 1976 the brand entered publishing business with the book Infant development program: birth-12 months by Richard A. Chase, followed by The First wondrous year: you and your baby (1979) by Chase and Richard R. Rubin.

=== Johnson's Baby Wipes (1980) ===
Johnson's baby wipes appeared in 1980 as Johnson's Baby Wash Cloths.

The product was renamed "wipes" sometime during 90s (the product has already been present as early as 1990).

=== Sun Screen (1991) ===
Sun screen was introduced in Spring 1991.

=== Head-To-Toe Cleanser (1997) ===
Head-To-Toe ultra mild cleanser was introduced in 1997.

=== Bedtime range (2000) ===
Bedtime Bath introduced in 2000 was the first of products later known as Johnson’s Baby Bedtime range with four products (Bedtime Bath, Bedtime Lotion, Bedtime Wash and Bedtime Oil) that contain lavender and camomile.

== Non-infant use ==
Johnson's Baby products are also used for non-baby-related purposes. For example, Johnson's Baby Oil is used as a facial cleanser (it has been reported by the New York magazine that popular TV talk show host Martha Stewart uses it this way) and by male strippers.

== Health risk issues ==
In December 1985 two physicians urged parents not to use baby powder, stating that it was unsafe to inhale and Johnson & Johnson responded with an official statement that "product is safe when used as it is intended".

In February 2016, J&J was ordered to pay $72 million in damages to the family of Jackie Fox, a 62-year-old woman who died of ovarian cancer in 2015. She had used Johnson's Baby Powder for many years. J&J claimed that the safety of cosmetic talc is supported by decades of scientific evidence and it plans to appeal the verdict. The British charity, Ovacome was quoted as saying that while there were 16 studies which showed that using talc increased the risk of ovarian cancer by around a third, and a 2013 review of US studies had similar results for genital, but not general, talcum powder use they were not convinced that the results were reliable. Furthermore, they said, "Ovarian cancer is a rare disease, and increasing a small risk by a third still gives a small risk."

== Clinical studies ==
In 2007 Johnson & Johnson sponsored "1st European Round Table meeting on 'Best Practice for Infant Cleansing" (a panel of expert dermatologists and paediatricians from across Europe) focused on the use of liquid cleansers in bathing as opposed to washing with water which said that "bathing is generally superior to washing, provided basic safety procedures are followed, and has psychological benefits for the infant and parents".

A randomized clinical trial, sponsored by Johnson's baby brand in 2010, studied the effectiveness of using moisturizer as part of a standardized skin care regimen. Research showed that using baby lotion is effective for maintaining favorable moisture levels in baby skin (in comparison to not using baby lotion).

In February 2013 Journal of Obstetric, Gynecologic, & Neonatal Nursing published a research by academics at The University of Manchester that showed that washing newborn babies with Johnson’s Baby Top-to-Toe wash is just as safe as using water alone. Research has been sponsored by Johnson & Johnson "but carried out under strict, independent scientific protocols, including blind testing and peer review".
