= 2010 Johnson & Johnson children's product recall =

Children's medicines recall

The 2010 Johnson & Johnson children's product recall involved 43 over-the-counter children's medicines announced by McNeil Consumer Healthcare, a subsidiary of Johnson & Johnson, on April 30, 2010. Medications in the recall included liquid versions of Tylenol, Tylenol Plus, Motrin, Zyrtec, and Benadryl. The products were recalled after it was determined that they "may not fully meet the required manufacturing specifications". The recall affected at least 12 countries.

== Discovery of manufacturing problems ==
During a routine inspection on April 19, federal investigators found several "manufacturing deficiencies" at a McNeil manufacturing facility in Fort Washington, Pennsylvania, United States. According to the Food and Drug Administration (FDA), the plant's manufacturing process was "not in control," meaning it was using flawed procedures that could potentially lead to manufacturing errors. As a result, some products "may contain a higher concentration of active ingredient than is specified; others contain inactive ingredients that may not meet internal testing requirements; and others may contain tiny [foreign] particles." Foreign particles could potentially include solidified ingredients or "manufacturing residue such as tiny metal specks" or mold.

It was not clear when the problems began, but FDA official Douglas Stearn said it "does go back in time". The official FDA report, released May 4, said investigators found thick dust, grime, and contaminated ingredients at the manufacturing plant. Burkholderia cepacia bacteria was found on some equipment which, according to Johnson & Johnson, never was actually put into use.

== Recall ==
According to the FDA, the agency alerted Johnson & Johnson of the problem via letter on Friday, April 30. That evening, McNeil announced a voluntary recall of the affected products. According to Johnson & Johnson spokesperson Bonnie Jacob, the company had conducted an independent internal assessment and already alerted the FDA of recall plans before the letter arrived. Canada, Dominican Republic, Fiji, Guam, Guatemala, Jamaica, Kuwait, Puerto Rico, Panama, Trinidad and Tobago, the United Arab Emirates, and the United States were affected by the recall. It includes all non-expired packages produced in the United States – more than 100,000 bottles of medicine in total. "A vast portion of the [American] children's medicine market" was affected by the recall. In Canada, only Children's Motrin and Children's Tylenol Cough & Runny Nose were affected by the recall.

According to the FDA, consumers should stop using the recalled products even though the chance of related health problems was "remote." A McNeil spokesperson stated that the recall was not made on "the basis of adverse medical events". As of May 2, no injuries or deaths have been reported.

All production at the deficient plant has been voluntarily halted, but McNeil declined to state when the plant first ceased operations. In a statement, Johnson & Johnson said "a comprehensive quality assessment across its manufacturing operations" was underway. According to a spokesperson, fixes had already been identified by May 2, and would be put in place before operation resumed. A dedicated website and telephone hotline were established by the company to handle customer inquiries. The phone line was initially overwhelmed by a high call volume.

== Aftermath ==
On May 6, The House Committee on Oversight and Government Reform launched an investigation into Johnson & Johnson, saying that the recall combined with previous recalls "point to a major problem" with the company's production. "Taken together, these recalls point to a major problem in the production of McNeil products," said a statement from the panel's leadership. The company issued four recalls in the preceding year, and has recalled a variety of products since.

== List of affected products ==
- Children's Benadryl Allergy liquids (one variety)
- Motrin Infants' drops (three varieties)
- Children's Motrin suspensions (eleven varieties)
- Tylenol Infants' drops (seven varieties)
- Children's Tylenol suspensions (eight varieties)
- Children's Tylenol Plus suspensions (nine varieties)
- Children's Zyrtec liquids (five varieties)
