= Mylanta =

Brand name of antacid

Mylanta logo

Mylanta is a brand of over-the-counter drugs for digestive problems, manufactured by Infirst Healthcare USA under license from McNeil Consumer Healthcare, a division of Kenvue (formerly Pfizer since 2007 following its acquisition). It includes several different products intended to treat heartburn and bloating.

== Recall and availability ==
In November 2010, Mylanta was voluntarily recalled due to what is described as some labelling concerns. According to sources within the company at that time, these concerns stemmed from the fact that small traces of alcohol were found in the flavoring agents of the liquid version of the antacid which was not disclosed on the labelling itself, and that the problem would be rectified "shortly". Generic liquid antacids comparable to Mylanta are now available (e.g., under the brand name "equaline" among others).

Mylanta was reintroduced to the market in 2016.

== Product ingredients ==
The liquid suspension contains calcium carbonate 800 mg-1000 mg, magnesium hydroxide 270 mg and 80 mg simethicone in each 10ml dose. Various flavor are available. There are also Mylanta Gas Minis for the immediate relief of gas with 125 mg simethicone in three tablets. The gas minis are available in assorted fruit flavoring and mint.
