= Irvine W. Grote =

American chemist and scholar

Irvine Walter Grote (July 25, 1899 – August 6, 1972) was an American chemist and scholar. He was born in the Cameron Hill section of Chattanooga, Tennessee on July 25, 1899. He entered the University of Chattanooga, later University of Tennessee at Chattanooga, in 1918 and graduated in 1922.

== Life ==
=== Academic career ===
At the University of Chattanooga Grote joined the Kappa Sigma fraternity and earned his bachelor's degree. Following his time there he studied at Columbia University and earned his master's degree in 1923. He later attended the University of Cincinnati where he earned his Ph.D. in 1925.

=== Pharmaceutical and educational career ===
Following his graduation from University of Cincinnati in 1925, Grote started working for the William S. Merrell Company. While working there he became a faculty member of the Winthrop College in South Carolina. After only a year there, however, he began working for the Parke-Davis pharmaceutical company instead. Grote went on to accept a faculty position as an associate professor of chemistry at his alma mater in 1931, and eventually moved on to professor of chemistry in 1941. He would eventually become head of the Chemistry Department, from which he retired in 1964. From 1941 to 1972 Grote also served as scientific advisor for the Chattanooga Medicine Company, later to be called Chattem Co.

Grote might be most noted for his contributions to the development of over the counter medicines Rolaids and Bufferin. While working for Chattanooga Medicine Company he worked with John C. Krantz developing an antacid-buffer that Chattanooga Medicine Co sold to Bristol-Myers co who would market it as Bufferin. In 1955, the dihydroxy aluminum sodium carbonate compound he developed was given to American Chicle Co and became the active ingredient in Rolaids.

=== Personal life ===
Grote is said to have had one of the largest collections of wine and fine liqueurs. He had over 3000 bottles from more than a hundred countries. He married a fellow student at UC, Nita Marie Tansey, in 1926. He died in his sleep at his home on August 6, 1972. In honor of his service to education, the University renamed their science building after him and endowed a professorship bearing his name, as well as awarding scholarships to chemistry scholars.
