= Carefree (feminine hygiene) =

American feminine hygiene brand

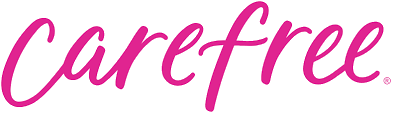

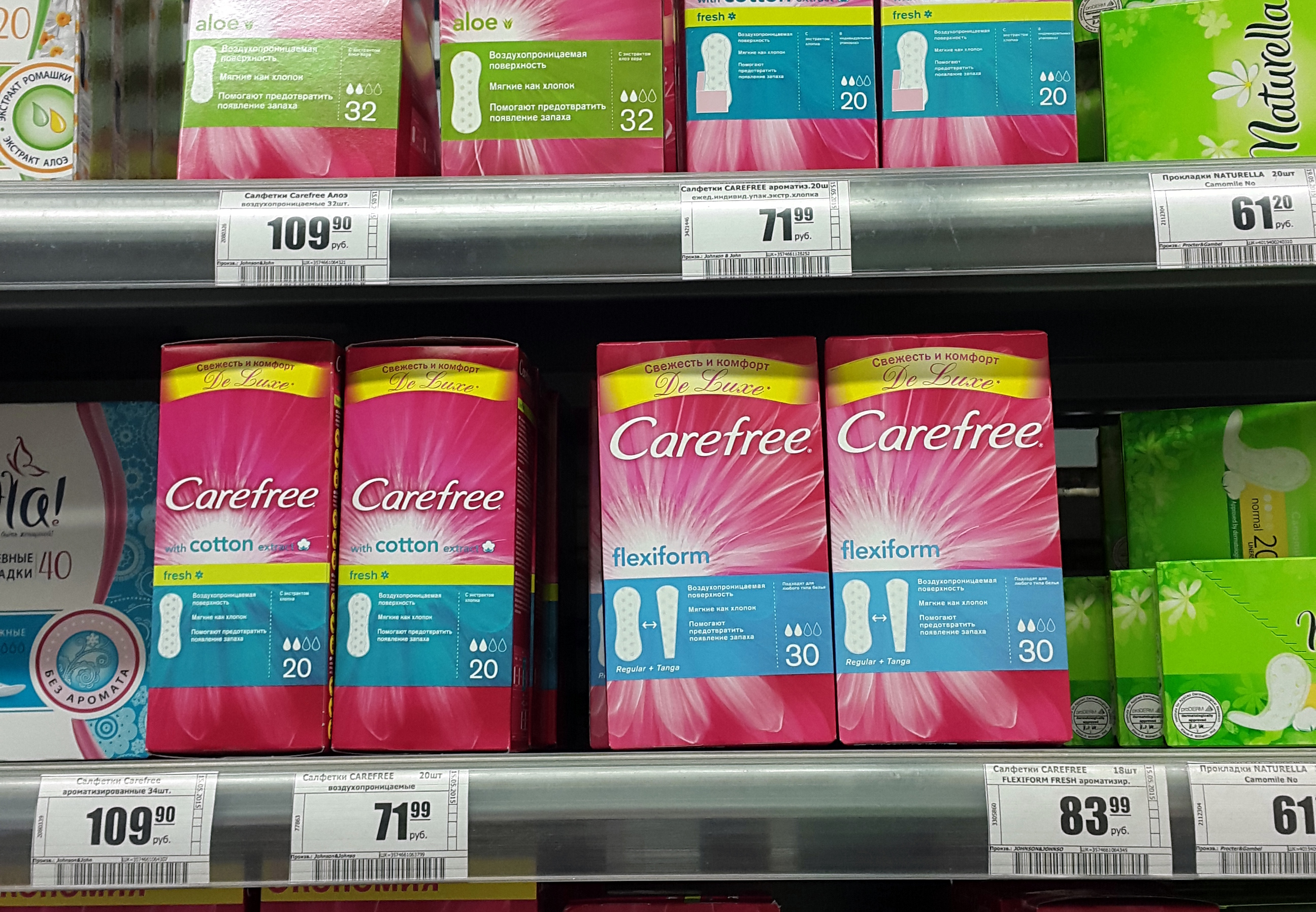
- Product type: Pantyliners
- Current owner: Edgewell Personal Care
- Country: United States
- Introduced: 1976; 50 years ago
- Markets: Worldwide
- Previous owners: Johnson & Johnson (US only)
- Website: carefreelinersandpads.com

Carefree is an American brand of pantyliners (although originally the brand name belonged to tampons) from Johnson & Johnson. In the US, the Carefree brand was formerly marketed by McNeil-PPC and currently being marketed by Edgewell Personal Care (along with other US feminine hygiene brands from Johnson & Johnson).

== History ==
"Carefree" panty liner was introduced in 1976 (trademark registered on May 27, 1976) and by the end of the 70s captured more than half of the market. It was promoted as a perfect solution for a "fresh-dressed woman" (tagline "For the fresh-dressed woman" has been developed by SSC&B advertising agency) for everyday use.

In 1997, Carefree held a 10% market share in the USA sanitary protection market.

In 2001, the black pantyliner Carefree Black was launched.

In 2008, Carefree introduced its Ultra Protection line which was discontinued sometime in 2012.

In 2012, the brand aired a controversial TV ad for Carefree Acti-Fresh pantyliners in New Zealand and Australia, mentioning the word "vagina". As soon as the ad appeared, the Advertising Standards Bureau received nine complaints.

== Products ==
The Carefree product line contains the following:

- ACTI-FRESH™
- Original
- Thong
- Ultra Protection
