= Rolaids =

Calcium and magnesium-based antacid

- Product type: Antacid
- Current owner: Procter & Gamble
- Country: U.S.
- Introduced: 1954
- Markets: Americas, the United Arab Emirates and Fiji
- Tagline: "Rolaids—that's how you spell relief"
- Website: www.rolaids.com

Rolaids is an American brand of calcium and magnesium-based antacid produced by Procter & Gamble. It was invented by American chemist Irvine W. Grote in the late 1920s, and originated with manufacturing in Chattanooga, Tennessee, under one of Chattem's forerunner companies, which manufactured the brand for Warner-Lambert; Warner-Lambert merged with Pfizer in 2000.

In 2006, McNeil Consumer Healthcare, a subsidiary of Johnson & Johnson, acquired the brand from Pfizer Consumer Healthcare. In 2013, McNeil sold the brand to Sanofi, following a two-year period where the brand was pulled off the market due to product recalls resulting from quality control and manufacturing issues that also kept former fellow antacid brand Pepcid AC's "chewables" product and other fellow McNeil products like some varieties of Tylenol off store shelves for the same period. Rolaids returned to the market at the beginning of September 2013 under Chattem ownership with new packaging, trade dress, and a new liquid variety. On March 27, 2024, the brand was acquired by Procter & Gamble.

Rolaids tablets come in many different flavors, including original peppermint, cherry, freshmint, fruit, tropical, punch, cool mint, berry, and apple.

== 2010 recall ==
McNeil Consumer Healthcare voluntarily recalled Rolaids products in the Americas, the United Arab Emirates, and Fiji on January 15, 2010, in consultation with the United States Food and Drug Administration. The company initiated the recall following an investigation of consumer reports of an unusual moldy, musty, or mildewlike odor that, in a small number of cases, was associated with temporary and nonserious gastrointestinal events. These events included nausea, stomach pain, vomiting, and diarrhea. At that time, the Rolaids website carried the following statement regarding product availability: "You may have noticed that ROLAIDS® products are not available at your local retailers. We are changing some of our manufacturing facilities where our products are made, a process that will take time to complete. We apologize for the inconvenience this may be causing you. Your health and comfort are important to us, and we assure you we are working hard to get ROLAIDS® product back on store shelves."

Another recall was issued around December 9, 2010, as a result of foreign objects that contained metal and wood particles. The foreign materials were caused by a third-party manufacturer during the production process. Several people complained when they took the product; they also had vomiting, strange taste, and tooth and gum injury. After this recall, beyond the small "candy aisle" rolls and chewable lines, the Rolaids line of products was drastically reduced and disappeared from most American retailers until Chattem returned the product to the market in the fall of 2013.

== Advertising ==
Rolaids' best-known commercial from the 1970s featured the famous tag line:

"How do you spell relief?"
"R-O-L-A-I-D-S"

In connection with the famous slogan, Rolaids sponsored the Major League Baseball award for top relief pitchers called the Rolaids Relief Man of the Year Award. The award was given yearly from 1976 through 2012.

== Rolaids softchews ==
Pfizer released a new version of Rolaids on April 6, 2006, branded Extra Strength Rolaids Plus Gas Relief Softchews. The product was produced as an alternative for people averse to the chalky consistency of regular Rolaids. They were widely advertised in multiple media formats.

Rolaids Softchews were originally developed and test marketed in Oklahoma City under the brand name Remegel by Warner Lambert in 1984.

== Medical information ==
The active ingredients are calcium carbonate (550 mg) and magnesium hydroxide (110 mg). The inactive ingredients are dextrose, flavoring, magnesium stearate, polyethylene glycol, pregelatinized starch, sucralose and sucrose. The new Chattem varieties have increased the amount of the active ingredients in the product, up to 1000 mg of calcium carbonate and 200 mg of magnesium hydroxide for the "ultra strength" varieties.

Minor side effects include constipation or stomach cramps. Serious side effects include loss of appetite, vomiting, dizziness, and headache.
