= Benylin =

Brand of medications

The Benylin logo

Benylin is a brand name owned by Kenvue for a range of cough, cold and flu medications. Some Benylin products also contain codeine, which is used to treat pain, cough and diarrhea.

The flagship cough syrup and cold care brand is marketed in several countries as Benylin DM, for its active ingredient, dextromethorphan. However, the range of products available in both solid dosage and liquid forms have formulations with multiple ingredients including pseudoephedrine, paracetamol (acetaminophen) and guaifenesin.

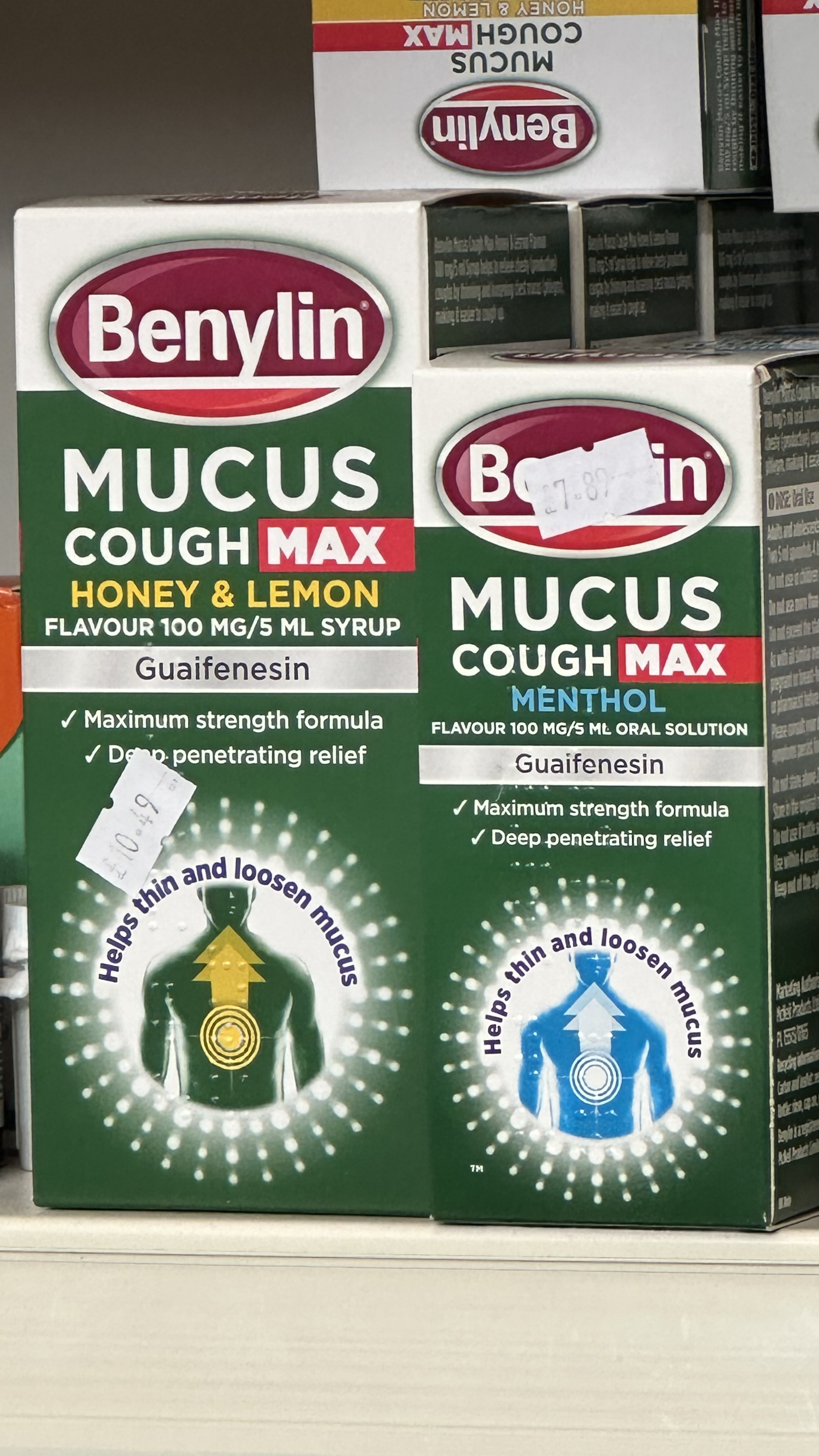
Benylin Mucus Cough Max liquid medicine bottles in a pharmacy

In 2016, it was one of the biggest-selling branded over-the-counter medications sold in the United Kingdom, with sales of £36.8 million. The brand was sold by Pfizer to Johnson and Johnson in 2008.
