= Tylenol =

Medication

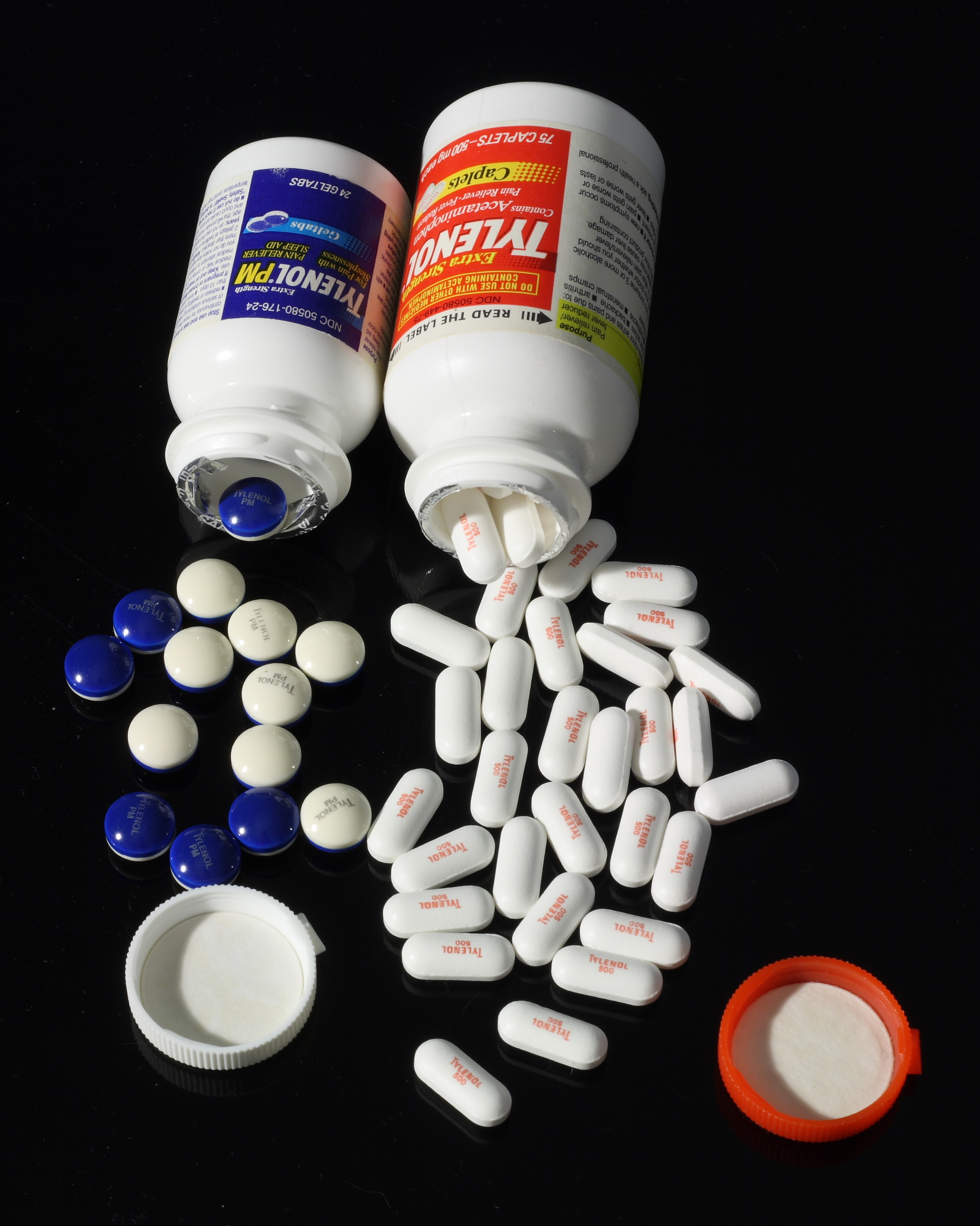
- Tylenol PM (left) and Tylenol
- Product type: Analgesic
- Current owner: Kenvue
- Country: United States
- Introduced: 1955; 71 years ago
- Markets: Worldwide
- Tagline: For What Matters Most
- Website: www.tylenol.com

Tylenol is an American brand of medication, advertised for reducing pain, reducing fever, and relieving the symptoms of allergies, cold, cough, headache, and influenza. An active ingredient in these medications is acetaminophen (paracetamol), an analgesic and antipyretic, although other ingredients with significant effects (such as codeine, caffeine or diphenhydramine) are included in some variants. Like the generic names paracetamol and acetaminophen, the brand name Tylenol is derived from a chemical name for the compound, N-acetyl-para-aminophenol.

Tylenol is sold by Kenvue, until 2022 part of Johnson & Johnson.

== Products ==
The active ingredient in Tylenol products is acetaminophen (known as paracetamol in most countries), a widely used over-the-counter analgesic (pain reliever) and antipyretic (fever reducer). Formulations with additional active ingredients intended to target specific applications are sold under the Tylenol brand. These can include codeine as co-codamol, dextromethorphan, methocarbamol, guaifenesin, pseudoephedrine, caffeine, diphenhydramine, chlorpheniramine, and phenylephrine.

Tylenol makes combination products containing acetaminophen and the antihistamine diphenhydramine under names such as Tylenol PM in the United States and Tylenol Nighttime in Canada.

A form that contains dextromethorphan, pseudoephedrine, acetaminophen, and chlorpheniramine, is sold as Cotylenol.

== History ==
The brand was introduced in 1955 by McNeil Laboratories, a family-owned pharmaceutical manufacturer. Two brothers took over the company from their father that year, and one of them subsequently learned about acetaminophen, which was not on the US market at the time. To avoid competing with aspirin, they marketed it as a product to reduce fever in children, packaging it like a red fire truck with the slogan, "for little hotheads". The brand name Tylenol and the United States Adopted Name acetaminophen were generated by McNeil from the chemical name of the drug, N-acetyl-para-aminophenol (APAP).

Johnson & Johnson bought McNeil in 1959, and the following year the drug was made available over the counter. In 2023, Johnson & Johnson spun-off its consumer health brands, including Tylenol, into a new company, Kenvue, retaining significant ownership; the company later became completely independent.

In 2025, President Donald Trump made several statements about a controversial and unproven connection between autism and Tylenol. These statements, about the connection between Tylenol during pregnancy and autism, are based on unreliable sources without scientific evidence. In October 2025, Texas Attorney General Ken Paxton filed a lawsuit against Kenvue, claiming that the company violated the Texas Deceptive Trade Practices-Consumer Protection Act by concealing the risks of Tylenol in relation to autism.

In November 2025, Kimberly-Clark announced that it was buying Kenvue in a $40 billion deal, and would thus be the new owner of the Tylenol brand.

== Recalls ==
=== 1982 Chicago Tylenol murders ===
On September 29, 1982, a "Tylenol scare" began when the first of seven individuals died in the Chicago metropolitan area after ingesting Extra Strength Tylenol that had been deliberately contaminated with cyanide. Within a week, the company pulled 31 million bottles of tablets back from retailers, making it one of the first major product recalls in American history.

As a result of the crisis, all Tylenol capsules were discontinued, as were capsules of other brands. Calle & Company conceived the world's first tamper-resistant gelatin-enrobed capsule called "Tylenol Gelcaps", which proved to resuscitate 92% of the capsule-segment sales lost to the recall. The tamper-resistant, triple-sealed safety containers were placed on the shelves of retailers ten weeks after the withdrawal, and other manufacturers followed suit. The crisis cost the company more than US$100 million, but Tylenol regained 100% of the market share it had before the crisis.

The Tylenol murderer was never found, (though later James Lewis was a prime suspect) and a US$100,000 reward offered by Johnson & Johnson remained unclaimed as of 2023.

Before the poisonings, Tylenol brands held around 35% of the US market for acetaminophen and in the immediate aftermath, fell to 8%. Within a year sales had rebounded to the prior levels. J&J's handling of the crisis has been widely cited as an example of optimal crisis management.

These events led to the widespread use of tamper resistance packaging of drugs by drug companies, to the 1982 passage of a US federal law making tampering a crime, and to legislation in 1989 requiring tamper-proof packaging.

=== 2010 Tylenol recalls ===
In January 2010, a voluntary recall of several hundred batches of popular medicines was announced, including Benadryl, Motrin, Rolaids, Simply Sleep, St. Joseph Aspirin, and Tylenol. The recall was due to complaints of a musty smell suspected to be due to contamination of the packaging with the chemical 2,4,6-tribromoanisole. The full health effects of 2,4,6-tribromoanisole are not known but no serious events have been documented in medical literature. The recall came 20 months after McNeil first began receiving and investigating consumer complaints about moldy-smelling bottles of Tylenol Arthritis Relief caplets, according to the US Food and Drug Administration. The recall included 53 million bottles of over-the-counter products, involving lots in the Americas, the United Arab Emirates, and Fiji.

=== Children's Tylenol ===
In April 2010, another recall was issued for 40 products including liquid infant and children's pain relievers Tylenol and Motrin, and allergy medications Zyrtec and Benadryl. A report from the US Food and Drug Administration (FDA) said its inspectors found thick dust and grime covering certain equipment, a hole in the ceiling, and duct tape-covered pipes at the Fort Washington, Pennsylvania, facility that made 40 products recalled. New testing regulations were enacted after the recall to ensure product quality and safety.

In May 2010, the FDA confirmed that the bacterium found at the Johnson & Johnson plant that made the recalled Children's Tylenol was Burkholderia cepacia, a bacterium often resistant to common antibiotics. The bacteria were found on the outside of certain product-containing drums, but not in the finished product. The US Centers for Disease Control and Prevention stated that Burkholderia cepacia is not likely to cause health problems for those with healthy immune systems. Those with weaker ones and those with chronic lung diseases, such as cystic fibrosis, could be more susceptible to infection.

== Advertising ==
Tylenol has many different advertisement approaches. One of these advertisement campaigns focuses on "getting you back to normal", whereas the other commercials focus on Tylenol's current slogan, "Feel better, Tylenol". In the "Feel better, Tylenol" commercials, Tylenol places emphasis on the importance of sleep; various people are seen sleeping in this commercial while a voiceover describes how sleep can help repair and heal the human body during times of aches and pains. In the "getting you back to normal" commercial, Tylenol places more emphasis on helping its consumers get back to their daily routines; many different people are shown first experiencing headaches and other sorts of body pain, where a voiceover then states that Tylenol Rapid Release can help rid aches and pains; the various people are then shown enjoying their everyday lives, and are seen as "back to normal".

In an older commercial from 1986, four years after the Chicago Tylenol murders, Tylenol emphasized that it is the drug that American hospitals trust the most. In this ad, Susan Sullivan told the consumer that Tylenol was a drug that could be trusted by Americans since many doctors also trusted it; she went on to state that doctors prescribed Tylenol four times more often than other leading pain relieving drugs combined.

== Countries ==
As of 2021, the Tylenol brand is used in Australia, Brazil, Canada, China, Egypt, Japan, Kuwait, Lebanon, Mexico, Myanmar, Netherlands, Oman, Paraguay, the Philippines, South Africa, South Korea, Switzerland, Taiwan, Thailand, the United States, Uruguay, Venezuela, and Vietnam.

== See also ==
- Paracetamol brand names
