= Listerine =

Brand of mouthwash

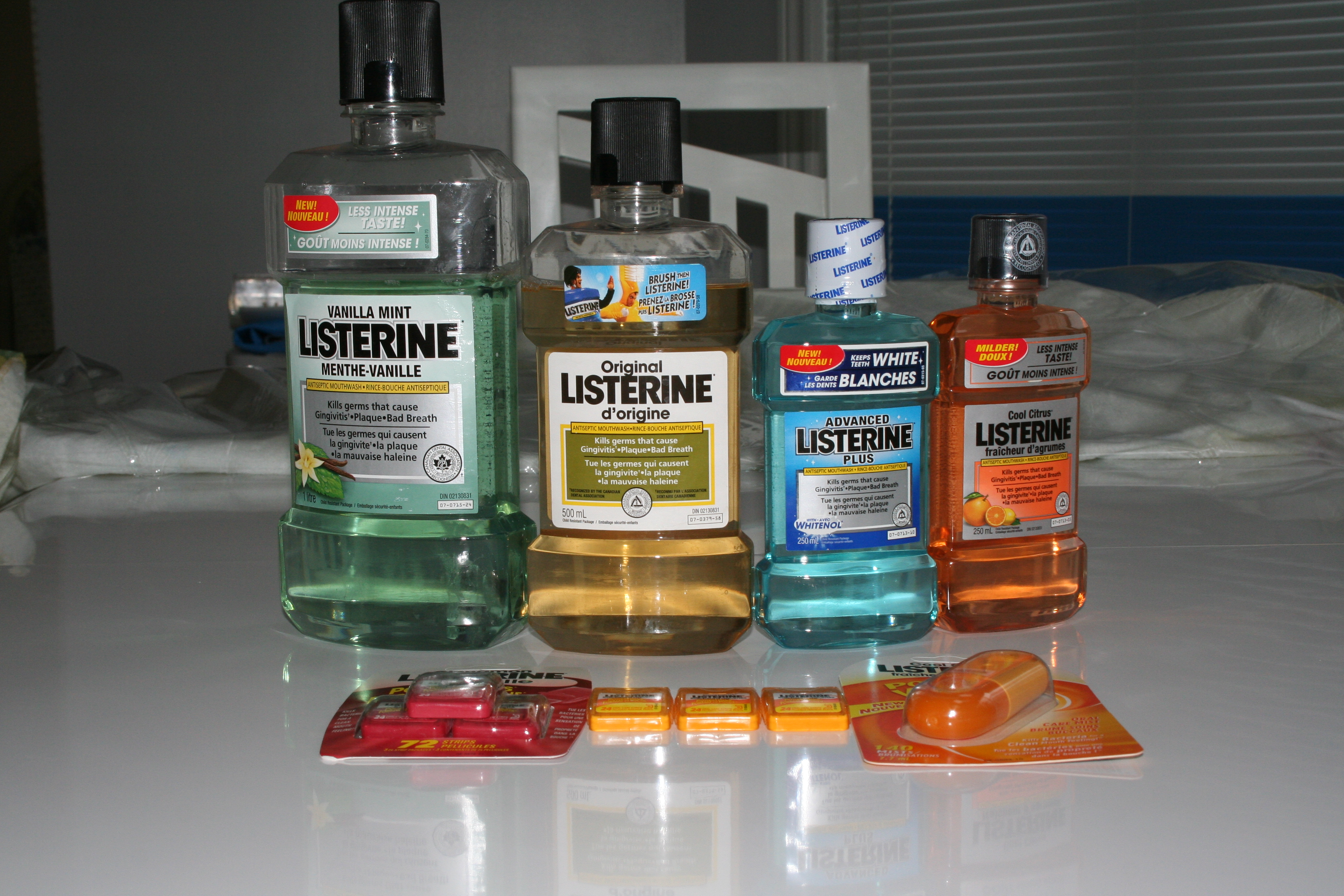
- Various Listerine products in Canada
- Product type: Mouthwash, toothpaste, fluoride rinse, quick-dissolving strips, chewable tablets, breath spray, dental floss
- Current owner: McNeil Consumer Healthcare division of Kenvue
- Country: United States
- Introduced: 1879; 147 years ago (original formula); 1914 (over the counter)
- Related brands: Plax
- Previous owners: Lambert Pharmacal Company; Warner–Lambert; Pfizer; Johnson & Johnson
- Tagline: "Kills germs that cause bad breath" "Bring Out the Bold"
- Website: www.listerine.com

Listerine (/ˈlɪstəriːn/ LIST-ər-EEN) is an American brand of antiseptic mouthwash that is promoted with the slogan "Kills germs that cause bad breath". Named after Joseph Lister, who pioneered antiseptic surgery at the Glasgow Royal Infirmary in United Kingdom, Listerine was developed in 1879 by Joseph Lawrence, a chemist in St. Louis, Missouri.

Originally marketed by the Lambert Pharmacal Company (which later became Warner–Lambert), Listerine has been manufactured and distributed by Johnson & Johnson since its acquisition of Pfizer's consumer healthcare division on December 20, 2006.

The Listerine brand name is also used in toothpaste, chewable tablets, and self-dissolving teeth-whitening strips.

== History ==
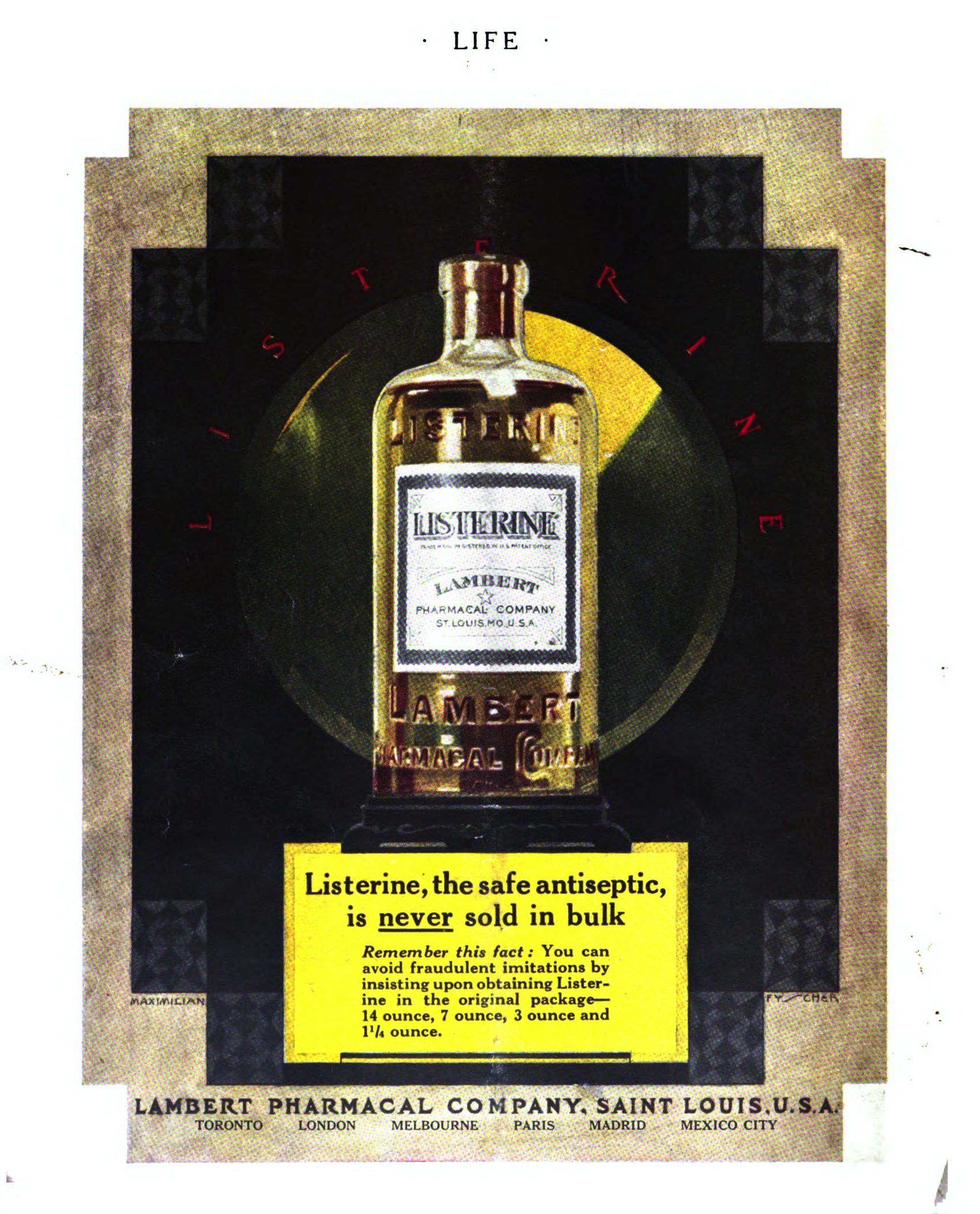
1925 advertisement

Inspired by Louis Pasteur's ideas on microbial infection, the English doctor Joseph Lister demonstrated in 1865 that use of carbolic acid on surgical dressings would significantly reduce rates of post-surgical infection. Lister's work in turn inspired St. Louis-based doctor Joseph Lawrence to develop an alcohol-based formula for a surgical antiseptic which included eucalyptol, menthol, methyl salicylate, and thymol (its exact composition was a trade secret). Lawrence named his antiseptic "Listerine" in honor of Lister.

Lawrence hoped to promote Listerine's use as a general germicide as well as a surgical antiseptic, and licensed his formula to a local pharmacist named Jordan Wheat Lambert in 1881. Lambert subsequently started the Lambert Pharmacal Company, marketing Listerine. Listerine was promoted to dentists for oral care in 1895 and was the first over-the-counter mouthwash sold in the United States, in 1914.

Lambert's licensing agreement with Lawrence required that he and his "heirs, executors and assigns" be paid royalties by Lambert or its successors for each bottle sold in perpetuity, until such time that Lambert or its successors ceases manufacturing Listerine. Most of these royalty shares are held by Lawrence's heirs. Real estate broker John Reynolds bought a roughly 50% stake in the royalties in the 1950s, which he then transferred to the Archdiocese of New York, and was later resold to other parties to help fund the diocese. The Salvation Army, American Bible Society, and Wellesley College also held shares in Listerine royalties.

Listerine entered common household use after Jordan Wheat Lambert's son Gerard Lambert joined the company and promoted an aggressive marketing campaign. According to Steven D. Levitt and Stephen J. Dubner's book Freakonomics:

Listerine, for instance, was invented in the nineteenth century as powerful surgical antiseptic. It was later sold, in distilled form, as both a floor cleaner and a cure for gonorrhea. But it wasn't a runaway success until the 1920s, when it was pitched as a solution for "chronic halitosis"—a then obscure medical term for bad breath. Listerine's new ads featured forlorn young women and men, eager for marriage but turned off by their mate's rotten breath. "Can I be happy with him in spite of that?" one maiden asked herself. Until that time, bad breath was not conventionally considered such a catastrophe. But Listerine changed that. As the advertising scholar James B. Twitchell writes, "Listerine did not make mouthwash as much as it made halitosis." In just seven years, the company's revenues rose from $115,000 to more than $8 million.

In 1955, Lambert Pharmacal merged with New York–based Warner-Hudnut and became Warner-Lambert Pharmaceutical Company, and incorporated in Delaware with its corporate headquarters in Morris Plains, New Jersey. Following the merger, Warner-Lambert attempted to back out of the aforementioned royalty agreements with Lawrence by filing a lawsuit in the United States District Court for the Southern District of New York. The company cited that the payments were based upon Listerine's formula having initially been a trade secret, but that since the formula had been published in 1931, the property no longer had a value, and that the indefinite agreement was legally unreasonable. The court, however, ruled in favor of Lawrence and the defendants, citing that the conditions were plainly-worded, implicit, and could be waived by ending production of the product.

In 2000, Pfizer acquired Warner-Lambert. Among Lambert's assets was the original land for Lambert-St. Louis International Airport.

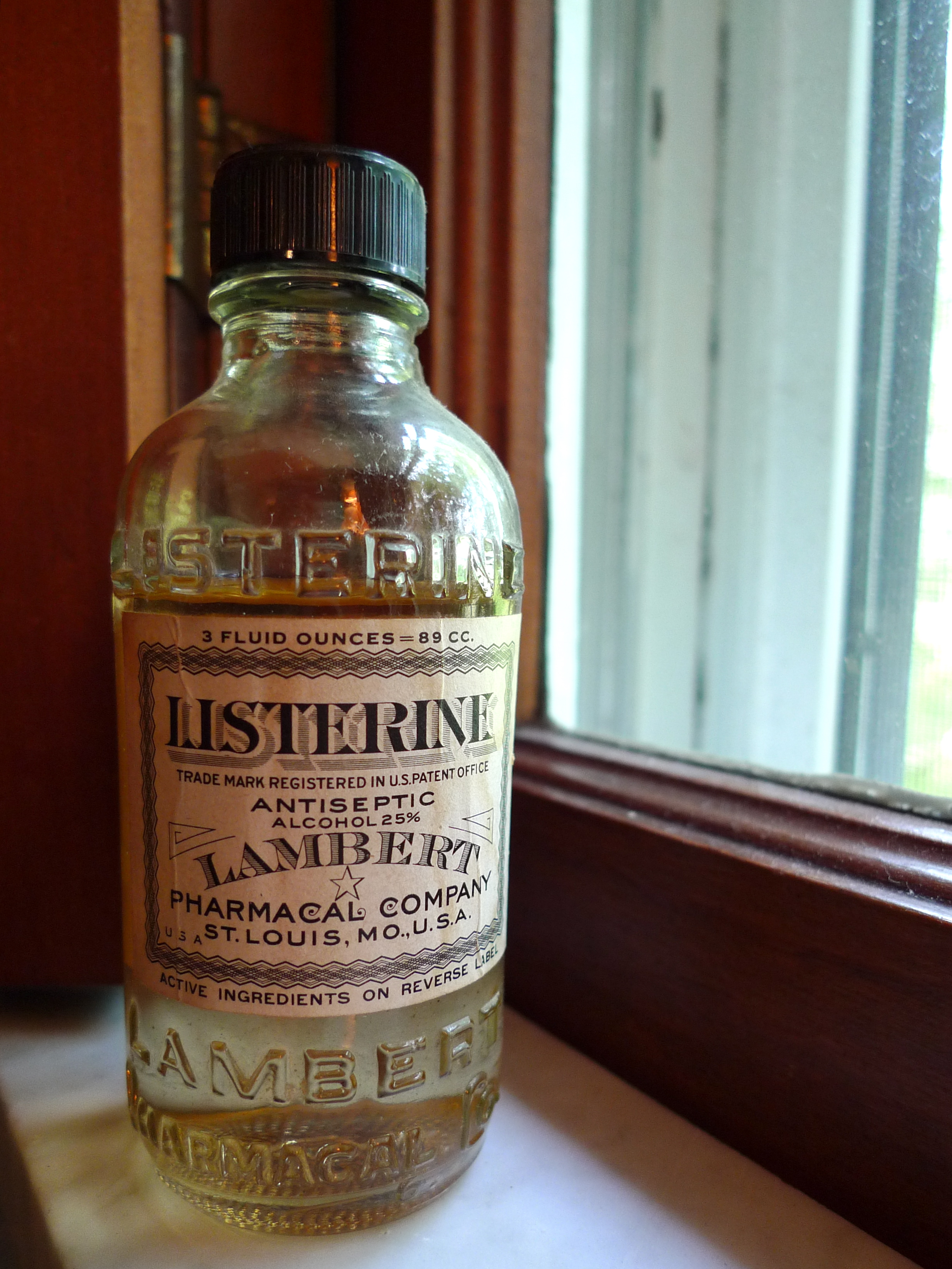
Glass bottle with paper label. The screw top indicates that the bottle was manufactured post-1920s.

From 1921 until the mid-1970s, Listerine was also marketed as preventive and remedy for colds and sore throats. In 1976, the Federal Trade Commission ruled that these claims were misleading, and that Listerine had "no efficacy" at either preventing or alleviating the symptoms of sore throats and colds. Warner-Lambert was ordered to stop making the claims, and to include in the next $10.2 million worth of Listerine ads specific mention that "Listerine will not help prevent colds or sore throats or lessen their severity." The advertisement run by Listerine added the preamble "contrary to prior advertising".

For a short time, beginning in 1927, the Lambert Pharmaceutical Company marketed Listerine Cigarettes.

From the 1930s into the 1950s, advertisements claimed that applying Listerine to the scalp could prevent "infectious dandruff".

Listerine was packaged in a glass bottle inside a corrugated cardboard tube for nearly 80 years before the first revamps were made to the brand: in 1992, Cool Mint Listerine was introduced in addition to the original Listerine Antiseptic formula and, in 1994, both brands were introduced in plastic bottles for the first time. In 1995, FreshBurst was added, then in 2003 Natural Citrus. In 2006 a new addition to the "less intense" variety, Vanilla Mint, was released. Nine different kinds of Listerine are on the market in the U.S. and elsewhere: Original, Cool Mint, FreshBurst, Natural Citrus, Naturals, Soft Mint (Vanilla Mint), UltraClean (formerly Advanced Listerine), Tooth Defense (mint shield), and Whitening pre-brush rinse (clean mint). In the United Kingdom, where in recent years the only option for most residents to obtain the original Listerine was to purchase from a dwindling number of larger branches of Boots the Chemist only the flavoured products are now obtainable as Boots has removed the Original from its selection. Original is not listed on the Listerine UK website as among the Listerine products available in the United Kingdom.

== Composition ==
According to the product overview, the ingredients are as following for Listerine Total Care. Similar distribution is contained in other varieties, which also list the essential oils as active ingredients.

=== Listerine Total Care ===
==== Active ingredient ====
- Sodium fluoride 0.02% (0.01% w/v fluoride ion)

==== Inactive ingredients ====
- Water
- Sorbitol
- Alcohol (21.6% v/v)
- Poloxamer 407
- Sodium saccharin
- Flavor
- Eucalyptol
- Methyl salicylate
- Thymol
- Phosphoric acid
- Menthol
- Disodium phosphate
- Sucralose
- Red 40
- Blue 1

Distributions in case of Listerine Antiseptic Mouthwash, Original-05/22/2008 for essential oils are: menthol (mint) 0.042%, thymol (thyme) 0.064%, methyl salicylate (wintergreen) 0.06%, and eucalyptol (eucalyptus) 0.092%.

== Benefits ==
In combination, all have an antiseptic effect, and there is some thought that methyl salicylate may have an anti-inflammatory effect as well. Ethanol, which is toxic to bacteria at concentrations of 40%, is present in concentrations of 21.6% in the flavored product and 26.9% in the original gold Listerine Antiseptic. At this concentration, the ethanol serves to dissolve the active ingredients.

Research indicates that Listerine can reduce dental plaque by 22.2% and gingivitis by 28.2% at 6 months. Dental plaque by 20.8% and gingivitis by 27.7% at 6 months, when compared with vehicle in test. The vehicle was 26.9% hydroalcoholic containing all ingredients in Listerine Antiseptic except its essential oils.

Listerine also sell a formulation called Listerine Advanced Defence Gum Treatment containing a common food preservative, ethyl lauroyl arginate (LAE) at 0.147%.

== Safety ==
=== Alcohol ===
The addition of essential oils means the ethanol is considered to be undrinkable, known as denatured alcohol, and it is therefore not regulated as an alcoholic beverage in the United States (Specially Denatured Alcohol Formula 38-B, specified in Title 27, Code of Federal Regulations, Part 21, Subpart D). However, consumption of mouthwash to obtain intoxication does occur, especially among alcoholics and underage drinkers.

The use of alcohol-containing mouthwash such as Listerine may increase the risk of developing oral cancer in some cases, see Oral cancer § Alcohol. In 2009, Johnson and Johnson launched a new alcohol-free version of the product called Listerine Zero.

=== Contaminants ===
On April 11, 2007, McNeil-PPC disclosed that there were potentially contaminants in all Listerine Agent Cool Blue products sold since its launch in 2006, and that all bottles were being recalled. The recall affected some 4,000,000 bottles sold since that time. According to the company, Listerine Agent Cool Blue is the only product affected by the contamination and no other products in the Listerine family were under recall.
