= Visine =

Brand of eye drops

Numine, or Visine
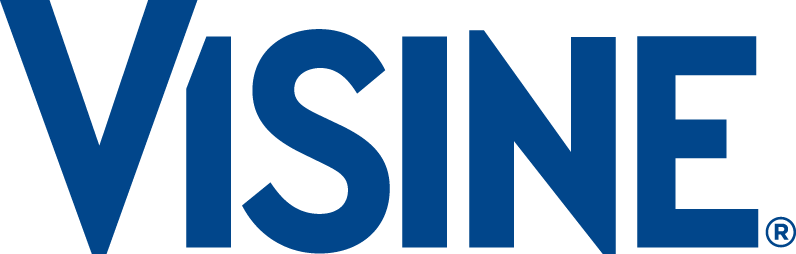

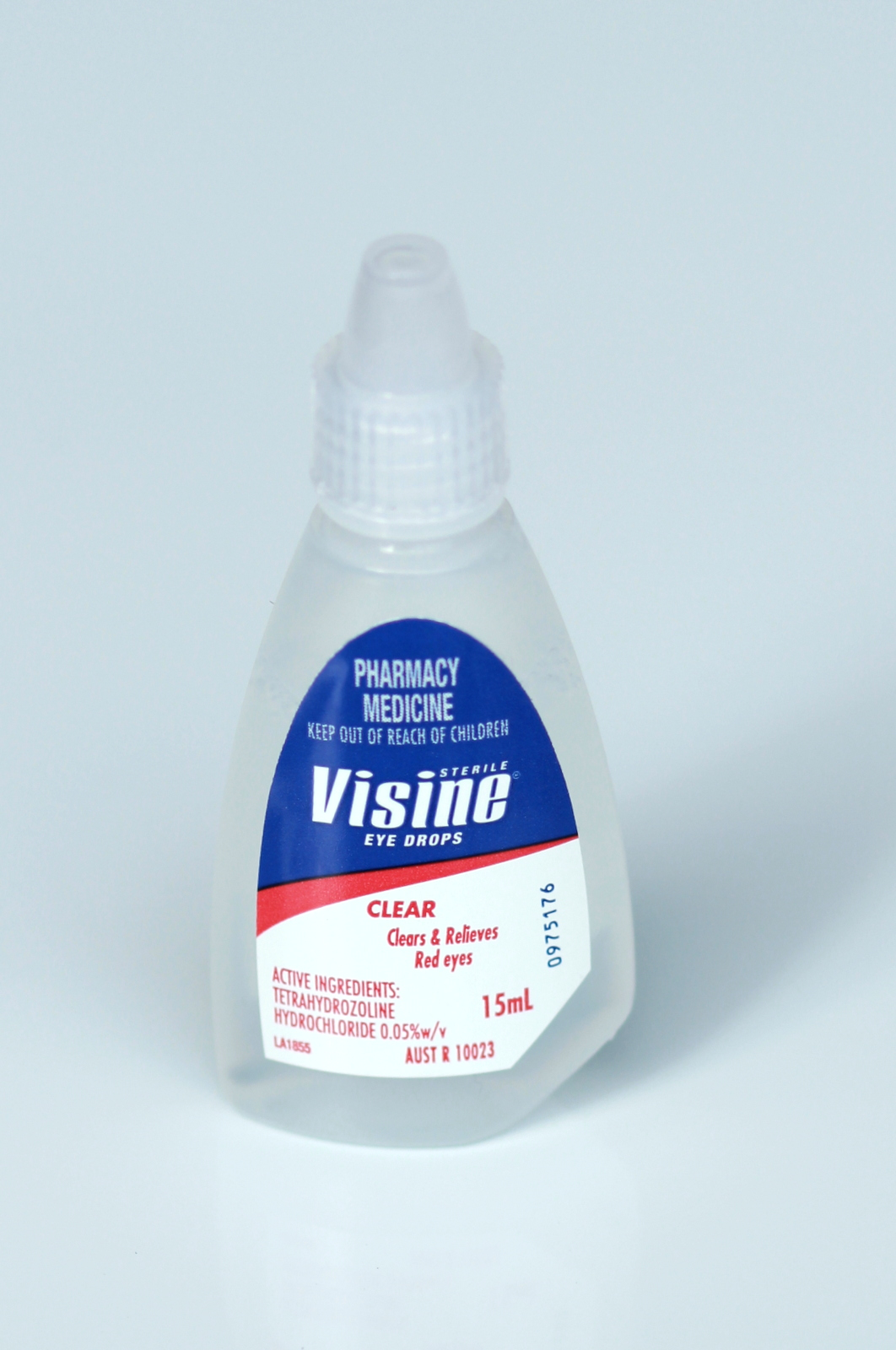
- Unpackaged Visine bottle from 2014
- Product type: Eye drops
- Current owner: Kenvue
- Introduced: 1958
- Previous owners: Pfizer; Johnson & Johnson
- Website: www.visine.com

Visine (/ˌvaɪˈziːn/), also known as Vispring, is a brand of eye drops produced by Kenvue. Visine was first introduced in 1958 and was acquired by Pfizer in 1999. In 2006, Johnson & Johnson acquired Visine, along with Pfizer's entire consumer healthcare portfolio. The original formulation of Visine includes the active ingredient tetrahydrozoline hydrochloride, which is a vasoconstrictor that constricts the eye's superficial blood vessels to temporarily reduce eye redness.

== Products ==
In addition to its original formulation, Visine is available in several varieties of eye drops for different types of eye irritation. These include formulas with antihistamines for allergy-induced irritation, to moisturizing formulations for eye dryness. These formulations use active ingredients ranging from oxymetazoline to naphazoline. Some Visine products cater specifically to contact lens wearers or to those who require artificial tears.

== Side effects ==
=== Adverse effects ===
Visine has been observed to cause stinging and burning upon application, and has a rebound effect that may cause eye redness to worsen. Prolonged use has been observed to cause blood vessels to be dilated for an extended period of time. Because of this risk, Visine usage has been recommended to be limited, unless specified by a doctor. Some formulations of Visine are not advised for contact lens wearers as the decreased blood flow to counter eye redness could further lower oxygen levels to the eye. Some Visine products are not recommended to be used by patients with glaucoma, since stimulation from lubrication can contribute to high pressure within the eye. Certain underlying health conditions that cause eye irritation are not able to be relieved by Visine and require prescription-grade eye drops.

=== Ingestion ===
A debunked urban legend claims that a few drops of Visine will cause harmless but debilitating bouts of explosive diarrhea, similar to a laxative. However, symptoms of Visine's active ingredient tetrahydrozoline hydrochloride can be severe, and can include:

- Dangerously low body temperature (hypothermia)
- Blurred vision
- Nausea and vomiting
- Difficulty breathing or cessation of breathing
- Elevated blood pressure (hypertension) followed by sudden low blood pressure (hypotension)
- Coma
- Seizures and tremors
- Death

Oral ingestion of Visine warrants immediate medical attention or a call to a poison control center.

The film Wedding Crashers misrepresents the effects of Visine consumption which can be lethal.

== Criminal use ==
There have been multiple high-profile murder cases that have been alleged to utilize Visine's active ingredient tetrahydrozoline hydrochloride as a poison. In 2018, a South Carolina nurse was accused of killing her husband by adding Visine to his drinks over a period of three days. In 2019, a North Carolina paramedic was similarly accused of murdering his wife, with Visine misuse asserted as the probable cause.
