= Neutrogena =

American cosmetics company

Neutrogena Corporation
- Type: Subsidiary
- Industry: Cosmetics
- Founded: 1930 (as Natone); 1962 (as Neutrogena)
- Founder: Emanuel Stolaroff
- Headquarters: Skillman, New Jersey, United States
- Area served: Worldwide
- Revenue: less than US$ 4 billion (2020)
- Parent: Kenvue
- Website: Neutrogena.com

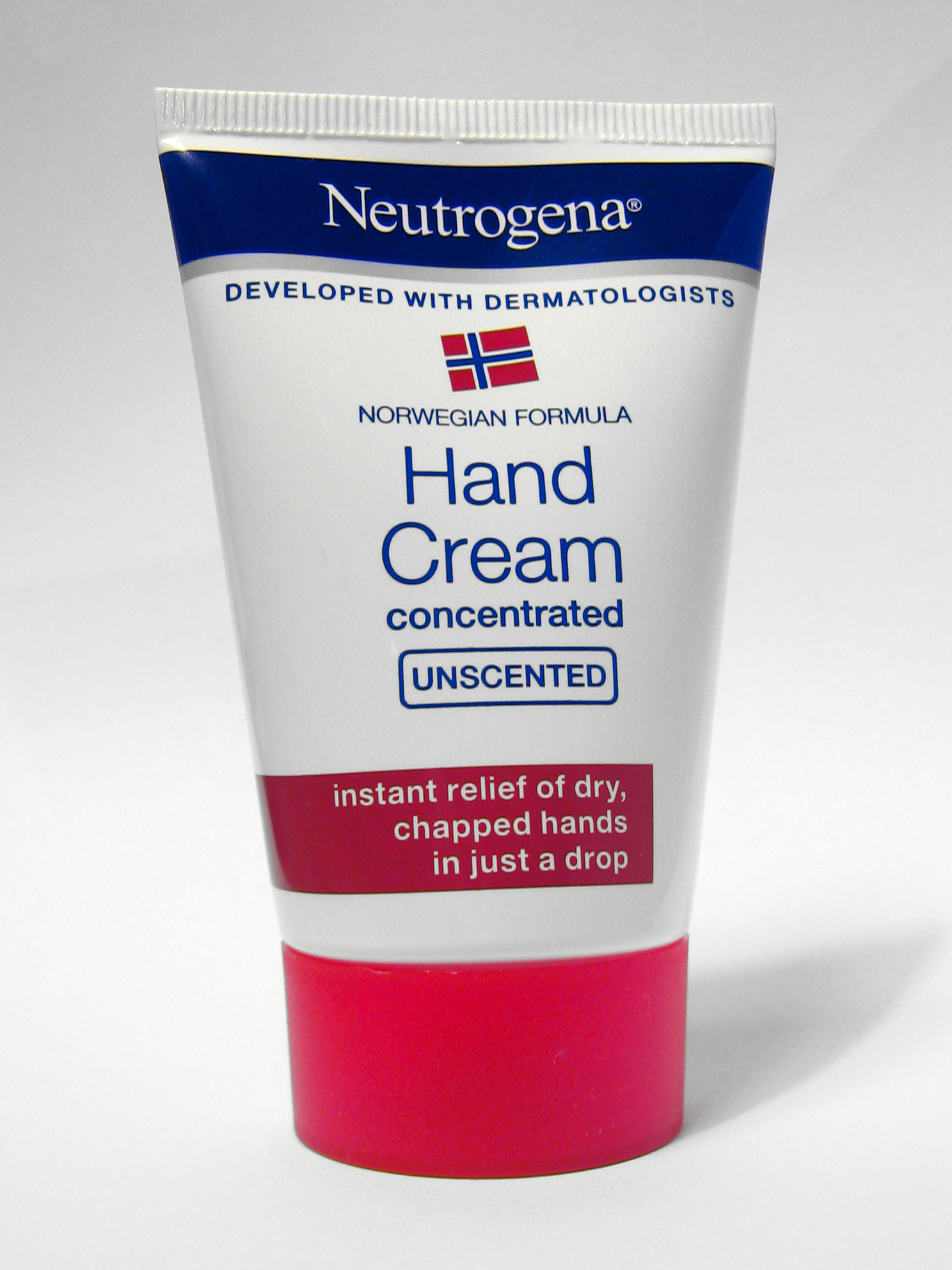
Neutrogena "Norwegian Formula" hand cream

Neutrogena Corporation, trading as Neutrogena, is an American company that produces cosmetics, skin care and hair care, is owned by parent company Kenvue and is headquartered in Skillman, New Jersey. According to product advertising at their website, Neutrogena products are distributed in more than 70 countries.

Neutrogena was founded in 1930 by Emanuel Stolaroff, and was originally a cosmetics company named Natone. Johnson & Johnson acquired the independent company in 1994.

The company originally supplied to department stores and salons that catered for the Hollywood film industry.

== History ==
In 1930, Emanuel Stolaroff started a small company called Natone. Stolaroff met Belgian chemist Edmond Fromont in 1954, and acquired the rights to distribute his patented formula of a mild clear soap that cleared the skin, without drying it, in the US. By then, Lloyd Cotsen had entered the Stolaroff family by marrying his daughter Joanne Stolaroff. In 1962, the company name was officially changed to Neutrogena Corporation; Cotsen became president in 1967.

The company listed publicly on the NASDAQ in 1973, with a market value of $1.2 million. Cotsen started marketing soap through two major channels: dermatologists and luxury hotels. The company launched product lines in acne and anti-aging areas. In 1982, profits reached US$3 million, and Cotsen was named the CEO.

In 1994, Johnson & Johnson acquired Neutrogena for $924 million, at a price of $35.25 per share. Johnson & Johnson's international network helped Neutrogena boost its sales and enter newer markets including India, South Africa, and China. Priced at a premium, Neutrogena products are distributed in over 70 countries. The company has major subsidiaries in Canada, United Kingdom, South Korea and India.

In 2020, Neutrogena launched Skin360, a free-to-use web application which employs advanced algorithms to analyze various aspects of a user's skin, taking into account factors such as hydration levels, texture, and fine lines. Additionally, it considers external elements like weather conditions and environmental changes, to provide a tailored assessment of the user’s skin, personalized skin care routine, and ongoing monitoring.

At the Consumer Electronics Show in January 2023, Neutrogena announced a partnership with Nourished, a vitamin brand that 3D-prints customized gummy supplements using Skin360.

=== Position on animal testing ===
As of 2023, Neutrogena is not certified by any major cruelty-free organizations such as PETA (People for the Ethical Treatment of Animals), Leaping Bunny, or Cruelty-Free International. This status indicates that Neutrogena products or the ingredients used in their products may be tested on animals, either by the company or its suppliers, or as required by law.

The company has stated that it does not conduct animal testing on their cosmetic products or ingredients, except in rare situations where governments or laws require it. For instance, Neutrogena sells products in China, whose regulators conduct animal testing on cosmetics to be sold within its territory.

Neutrogena has explored alternative testing methods in response to the growing consumer demand for cruelty-free products. The brand has invested in and utilized in vitro methods to ensure product safety and efficacy without the use of animal testing where regulations permit. For instance, the company has been a participant in industry consortia like the European Partnership for Alternative Approaches to Animal Testing (EPAA) since its inception in 2005.

== Products ==
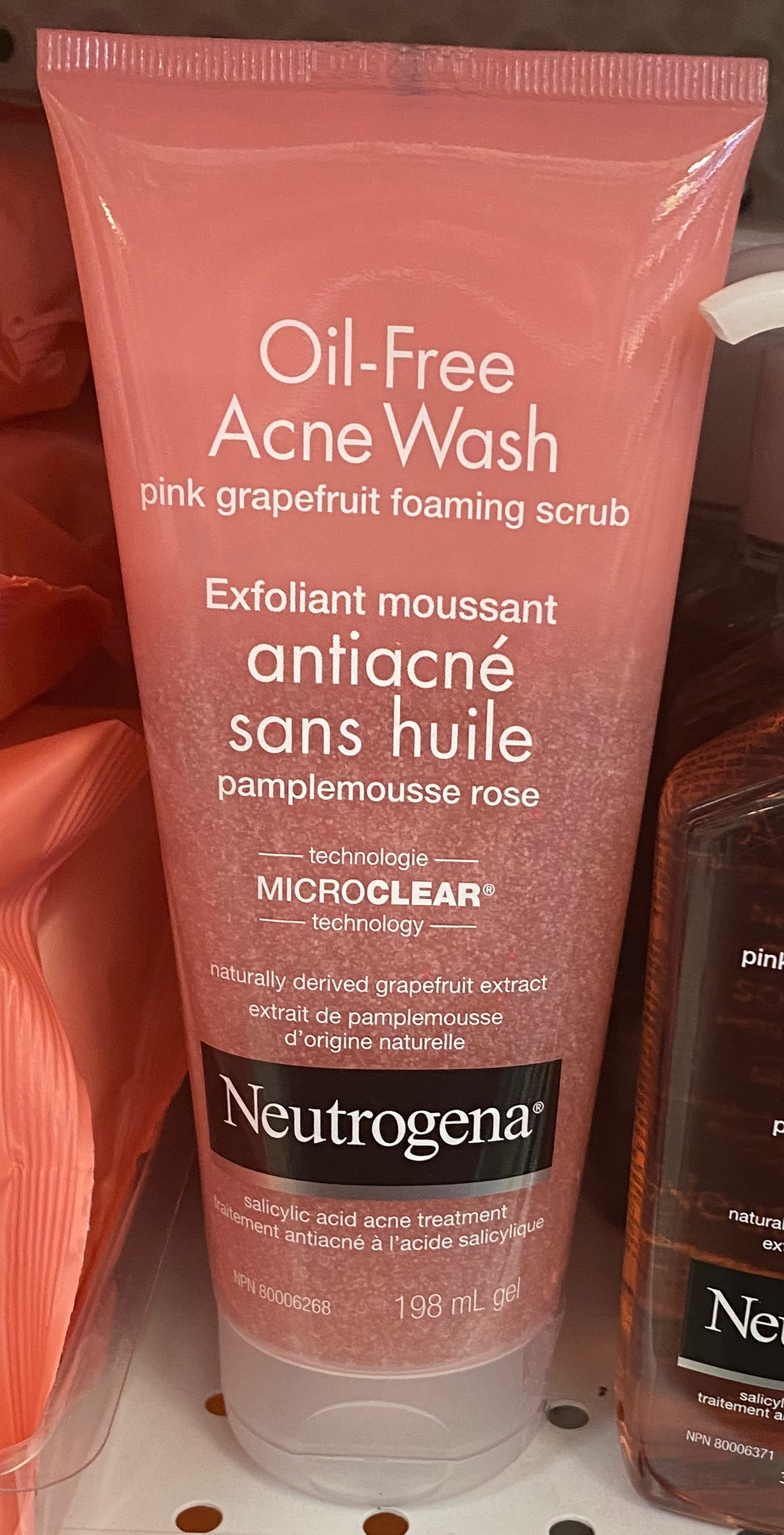
The version of the pink grapefruit "Oil-Free Acne Wash" available in Quebec, Canada.

Neutrogena has a multitude of product lines available in different countries. In the United States, Neutrogena has products in categories such as skin care (including sunscreen and acne treatments), makeup, and hair care.

Neutrogena products are not the same globally. For example, in the United States, Neutrogena sells an "Oil Free Acne Wash with Salicylic Acid," while in the United Kingdom, they sell the "Clear & Defend 2% Salicylic Acid Face Wash." Although both products contain 2% salicylic acid, they contain different inactive ingredients. Another example is the American "Oil-Free Acne Wash Pink Grapefruit Foaming Scrub" and the British "Clear & Radiant Daily Face Scrub." While both are face scrubs containing pink grapefruit, only the American version contains salicylic acid.

Neutrogena also promotes various causes through their products. For example, Johnson & Johnson lists them as one of their brands pioneering sustainable techniques in their industry by creating products such as plant-based compostable cleansing wipes. They also have released limited edition packaging in partnership with Care With Pride, which is run by Johnson & Johnson in support of the LGBTQ community.

== Promotional strategies ==
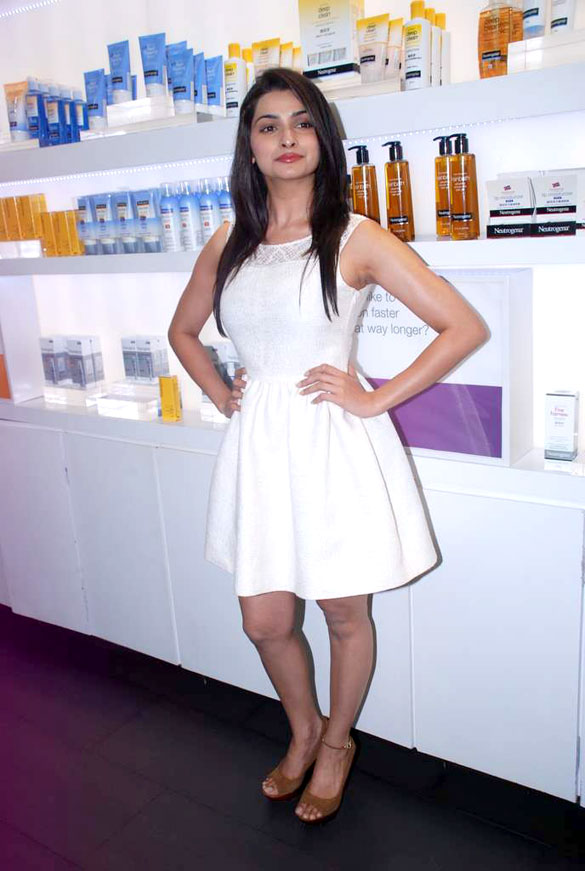
Prachi Desai at an event for Neutrogena

Neutrogena has used celebrity endorsements for years. In 2022, actress Jennifer Garner celebrated the 15th anniversary of her promotions with Neutrogena, with whom she has worked on various campaigns. Other ambassadors for the brand include Chloe x Halle, Lana Condor, Prachi Desai, Jenna Ortega, Sydney McLaughlin-Levrone, and John Cena.

While the brand was under Cotsen's leadership, they started to work with dermatologists in the US. Products are often labeled as recommended by or developed with dermatologists. The brand lists this as helping to "drive the business to new heights."

=== The Power of Light ===
In 2016, Neutrogena launched their first primarily digital campaign in the United States, The Power of Light, aligning with the launch of the Neutrogena Light Therapy Acne Mask. This campaign primarily consisted of short video ads and partnerships with influencers and public figures, such as Nash Grier and Olivia Holt. The campaign aimed to make the product seem more “fun, youthful, and vibrant.”

The campaign was successful, the growth in product awareness outperformed that of Johnson & Johnson's other campaigns by thirteen times. Reportedly, executives from Johnson & Johnson started to lean more into digital campaigns following its success.

=== Amazon ===
To increase sales of their line of Hydro Boost products in India, Neutrogena used the Demand Side Platform of Amazon. They created both video advertisements and display advertisements, linking viewers to the store. The project successfully drew consumers in, with a 9.8% conversion rate and a return on advertising spending of 4.8.

=== Spotify partnership ===
Neutrogena partnered with Spotify to promote the launch of Neutrogena's Stubborn Acne (AM) and Stubborn Marks (PM) product lines. The target audience for Neutrogena's ads coincided with the majority of people who listened to Spotify ads, that is Spotify users without a premium subscription. They created audio and visual ads which successfully increased listeners brand awareness and intention to purpose by 12 and 13 points respectively.

== Recalls and controversies ==
=== Sunscreen recall ===
In July 2021, parent company Johnson & Johnson recalled four Neutrogena aerosol sunscreen products (Beach Defense, Cool Dry Sport, Invisible Daily, and Ultra Sheer) and one Aveeno branded spray from stores in the United States after detecting the carcinogen benzene in some samples. The independent lab that conducted the research specified that the contamination was found in a specific batch of product rather than in a specific brand. The company went on to state that benzene is not used in the manufacturing process of the sprays and said it began an investigation into the source of the contamination.

=== Light Therapy Masks recall ===
In July 2019, Neutrogena issued a recall of its Light Therapy Masks, originally released in October 2016, as it was found to be a “theoretical risk of eye injury” for a small portion of the population with underlying eye conditions, as well as users taking medications that could enhance ocular photosensitivity. The brand specified that the product is safe to use for the general population, and that the recall was made out of an abundance of caution. The blue lights in the masks reportedly caused mild and transient visual adverse events.

=== Skin lightening products discontinuation ===
In 2020, parent company Johnson & Johnson decided to remove Neutrogena and Clean&Clear's "dark spot reducers" products from the shelves in Asia and the Middle East. The product, advertised as a dark spot reducer, was mainly purchased by consumers to lighten their skin tone. Accused of claiming that fairness or white was better than other skin colours, the company decided to discontinue the product. They also released a statement saying that "This was never our intention - healthy skin is beautiful skin." The production and shipping of the product has since then been stopped. This controversy came in light of the Black Lives Matter movement in 2020, after backlash towards companies using racist imagery as a selling point started erupting.

=== Dismissal of Hayden Panettiere as brand ambassador ===
Actress Hayden Panettiere, who served as a brand ambassador for Neutrogena from 2005 to 2015, stated on several occasions that the company was strongly opposed to her speaking publicly about her postpartum depression, particularly a 2015 appearance on Live with Kelly and Michael. Panettiere was dropped as a brand ambassador the following year. Panettiere's comments received renewed attention following her death in August 2026, which led to social media-based backlash and calls for boycotts against the company. A company-issued statement said, "We are proud to have partnered with her and understand that we made her feel unsupported during a very difficult time. This is not what Neutrogena stands for or who we want to be." The company also pledged significant contributions to women's health initiatives.
