= Baby powder =

Cosmetic powder usually made from talc or corn starch

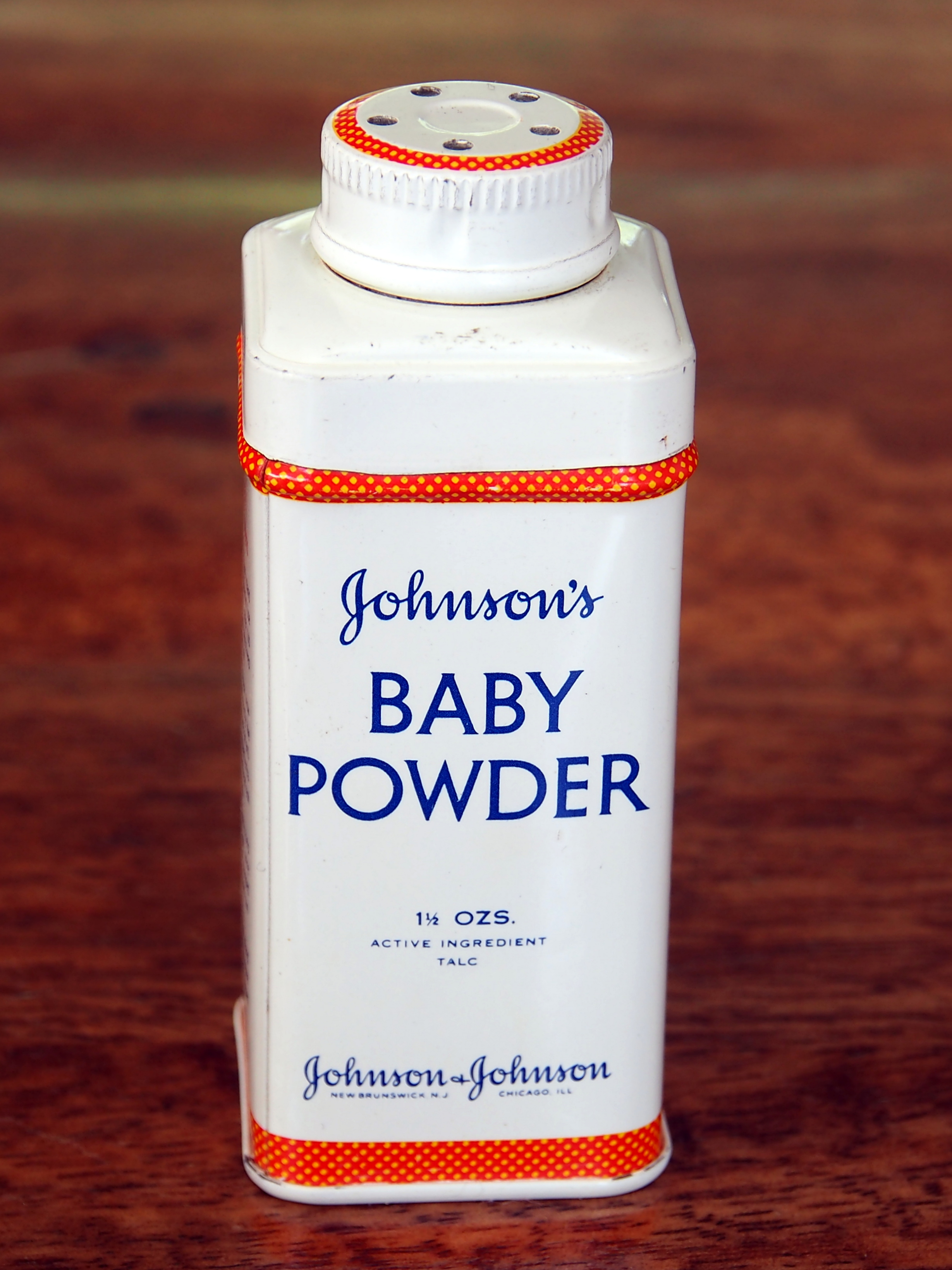
Johnson's baby powder made from talc in an old tin with a shaker on top

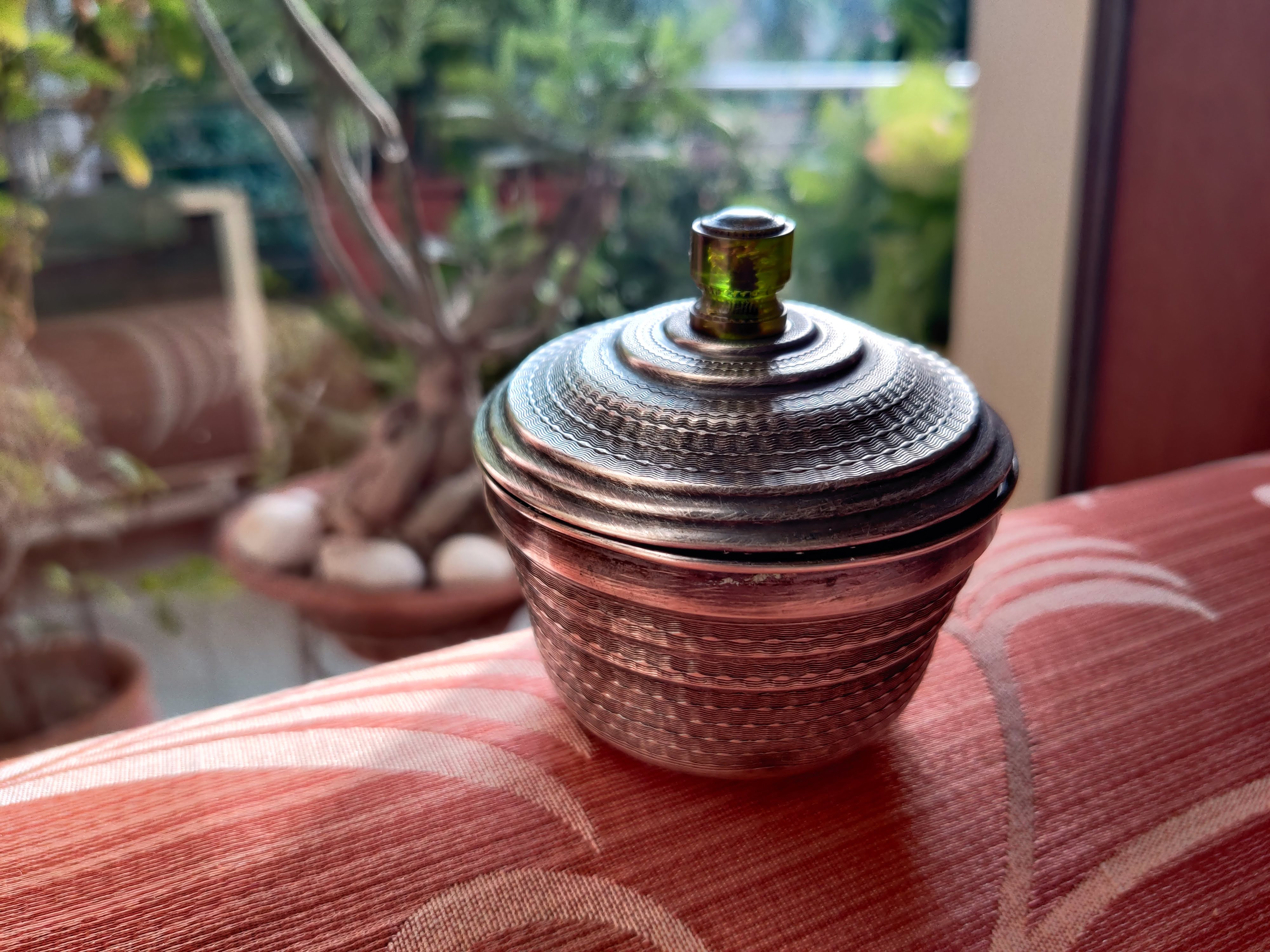
Traditional container for baby powder and puff in South India, made of silver

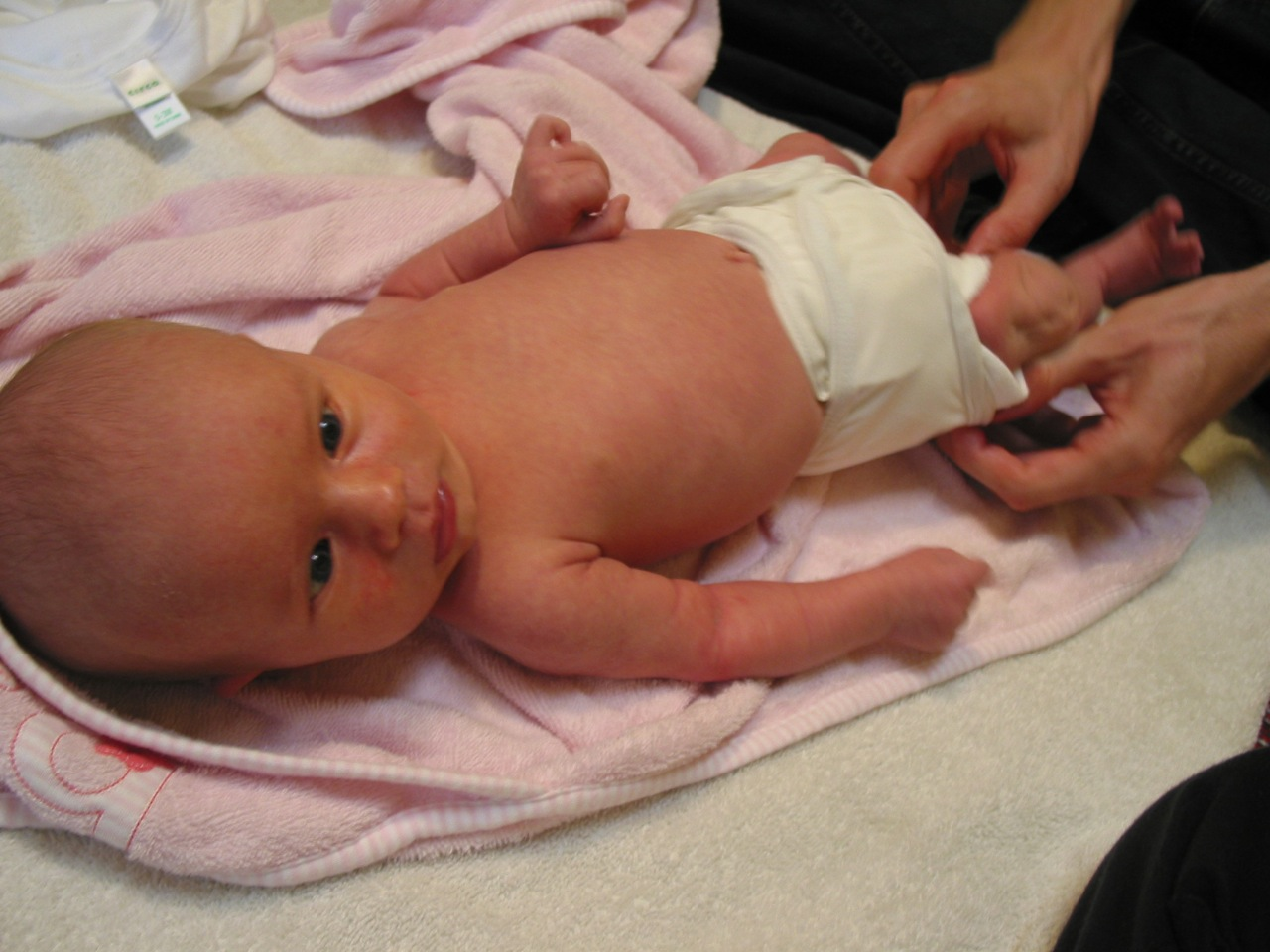
Baby powder might be applied after changing a diaper and cleaning the baby.

Baby powder is an astringent powder used for preventing diaper rash and for cosmetic uses. It may be composed of talc (in which case it is also called talcum powder), corn starch or potato starch. It may contain additional ingredients such as fragrances. Baby powder can also be used as a dry shampoo, cleaning agent (to remove grease stains), and air freshener.

== History ==
Talcum baby powder was pioneered in the early 1890s by Frederick Barnett Kilmer, the first scientific director of the then-fledging healthcare company Johnson & Johnson. In 1892, Kilmer prescribed talcum powder to ease skin irritation from Johnson & Johnson's medical plasters. The powder was soon found to ease irritation in babies' skin, and by 1894 Johnson's Baby Powder was being mass produced as its own product.

== Health risks ==
Talcum powder, if inhaled, may cause aspiration pneumonia and granuloma. Severe cases may lead to chronic respiratory problems and death. The particles in corn starch powder are larger and less likely to be inhaled.

Some studies have found a statistical relationship between talcum powder applied to the perineal area of female babies and the incidence of ovarian cancer, but there is not a consensus about causality. In 2016, more than 1,000 women in the United States sued Johnson & Johnson for covering up the possible cancer risk associated with its baby powder. In 1975, an official at the US federal Food and Drug Administration stated that "No mother was going to powder her baby with 1% of a known carcinogen irregardless [sic] of the large safety factor" as a comment on the testing methodology that J&J backed. The company stopped selling talc-based baby powder in the United States and Canada in 2020 and has said it will stop all talc sales worldwide by 2023, switching to a corn starch-based formula. However, Johnson & Johnson says that its talc-based baby powder does not contain asbestos and is safe to use.

Further, in 2025, 3000 people in the UK filed a lawsuit against Johnson & Johnson and its subsidiary Kenvue Ltd, alleging that the companies were aware of the presence of asbestos in its baby powder since the 1960s. Kenvue UK responded that their product was produced in accordance with relevant standards, did not contain any asbestos and that talc is not a carcinogen. The claimant cited the recent change in the composition of the powder as evidence of an issue; Johnson & Johnson replaced talc with cornstarch in 2023.

== See also ==
- Talcum powder – Phyllosilicate mineral in the pyrophyllite-talc group
- Corn starch
