= McNeil Consumer Healthcare =

American medical products company

McNeil Consumer Healthcare McNeil-PPC, Inc.
- Type: Subsidiary
- Industry: Pharmaceuticals, Healthcare
- Founded: 1879; 147 years ago
- Headquarters: Fort Washington, Pennsylvania, United States
- Key people: Denice Torres (president)
- Products: Tylenol, Motrin, Imodium, Lactaid, Listerine, Plax, Visine, Benadryl, Caladryl, Zyrtec, Mylanta, Mylicon, Pepcid, Benecol (US license)
- Parent: Kenvue (now part of Kimberly-Clark)

McNeil Consumer Healthcare is an American medicals products company belonging to Kenvue consumer health group. It primarily sells fast-moving consumer goods such as over-the-counter drugs.

== History ==
The company was founded on March 16, 1879, by 23-year-old Robert McNeil, who paid $167 for a drugstore complete with fixtures, inventory and soda fountain, as a retail pharmacy, in the Kensington section of Philadelphia, Pennsylvania, United States. Robert McNeil was a graduate of the Philadelphia College of Pharmacy and Science (University of the Sciences in Philadelphia).

In 1904, one of McNeil's sons, Robert Lincoln McNeil, became part of the company and together they created McNeil Laboratories in 1933. The company would focus on direct marketing of prescription drugs to hospitals, pharmacists, and doctors. Development of acetaminophen began under the leadership of Robert L. McNeil, Jr., who later served as the firm's chairman. In 1953 McNeil Laboratories introduced Algoson, a preparation containing acetaminophen together with sodium butabarbital, a sedative. In 1955, McNeil Laboratories introduced Tylenol Elixir for children, containing only acetaminophen.

In 1959, Johnson & Johnson acquired McNeil Laboratories and a year later the company was able to sell Tylenol for the first time ever, without a prescription. In 1961, the company moved into its Fort Washington, Pennsylvania headquarters. Along with its Fort Washington plant, McNeil also has plants worldwide.

In 1977, two companies were created: McNeil Medical Products and McNeil Consumer Products Company or McNeil Consumer Healthcare. The focus of McNeil Medical Products was to market prescription drugs.

Another major development in 1977 was that entrepreneur Alan Kligerman started to market a lactase supplement he originally called LactAid. In early 1991, Kligerman licensed the Lactaid brand (note the change of capitalization) to McNeil. Johnson & Johnson "poured millions into slick packaging and advertising," and turned Lactaid into its fastest-growing brand during the 1990s.

In 1993, McNeil Medical Products merged with Ortho Pharmaceutical to form Ortho-McNeil Pharmaceutical.

In 2001, McNeil Consumer Healthcare changed its name to McNeil Consumer & Specialty Medical Products. However, it was changed again and is now known as "McNeil Consumer Healthcare".

In 2018, Johnson & Johnson changed the name of the McNeil facility in Fort Washington, Pennsylvania to Johnson & Johnson Consumer Inc.

As part of Procter & Gamble's acquisition of Gillette in 2005, Procter & Gamble's Gillette was required by the Federal Trade Commission to divest itself of Rembrandt toothpaste. Consequently, it sold Rembrandt to Johnson & Johnson's McNeil-PPC division. That year, Rembrandt had sales that likely exceeded $100 million.

The company markets over-the-counter and prescription medical products including complete lines of Tylenol and Motrin IB (ibuprofen) products for adults and children. The company is located in Fort Washington, Pennsylvania, and employs 2,600 people. Annual sales in 2004 were US $2.1 billion. McNeil's Canadian head office is in Markham, Ontario.

In September 2022, Johnson & Johnson unveiled the name for its New Consumer Health Company that was being spun off: Kenvue. The name, pronounced ken-view, comes from the English word "ken," which is primarily used on Scotland and means knowledge, and "vue," which references sight. Kenvue, which became a company in 2023, would include brands in its portfolio such as Band-Aid, Aveeno, Listerine, Tylenol and Neutrogena, before the company was later acquired by Kimberly-Clark on November 2, 2026.

== McNeil Nutritionals ==
McNeil Nutritionals, LLC markets and sells a range of products including Lactaid, and Benecol in the UK, Ireland, Belgium, and in the US under license from Raisio Group.

In June 2007, McNeil became involved in lawsuits with Merisant, the makers of the artificial sweetener Equal. McNeil was the maker of sucralose (Splenda) sweetener at the time of the lawsuit with Merisant. It also produced a sweetener made with stevia and cane sugar, marketed as Sun Crystals.

In 2012, it started to sell a monk fruit-based sweetener called Nectresse.

== Johnson & Johnson Merck Joint Venture ==
Known as the "JV," this 50/50 joint venture between Johnson & Johnson and Merck handled the OTC product lines Pepcid, Mylanta, and Mylicon and is located at the McNeil Consumer Healthcare headquarters in Fort Washington, Pennsylvania.

In September 2011, however, the JV ended, when Merck sold its 50 percent interest in the joint venture. Merck said it sold its interest in the joint venture so it could focus on building the consumer products division it gained through its acquisition of Schering-Plough in 2009. By terminating the joint venture, Merck said it will have greater freedom to exploit opportunities to switch prescription medicines to over-the-counter products that can be purchased without a doctor's prescription. As a result, all former Johnson & Johnson-Merck products are now handled by McNeil Consumer Healthcare.

== 1982 Chicago Tylenol murders ==
In 1982, seven people were murdered in Chicago by Tylenol pills, manufactured by McNeil Consumer Healthcare, which had been tampered with after manufacture and placed on the store shelves.

== 2010 product recall ==
After serious quality and safety violations were found in 2010 at Johnson & Johnson's McNeil Consumer Healthcare plant in Fort Washington, Pennsylvania, numerous medicines were recalled. The Food and Drug Administration issued a report outlining 20 violations, including "filthy" conditions, bacteria that contaminated medicine supply drums and the plant "does not maintain adequate laboratory facilities for the testing and approval (or rejection) of components of drug products."

In April 2010, McNeil Consumer Healthcare recalled 43 over-the-counter children's medicines. Tylenol, Motrin, Zyrtec and Benadryl products were affected.
