= List of awards and nominations received by John Goodman =

John Goodman awards and nominations
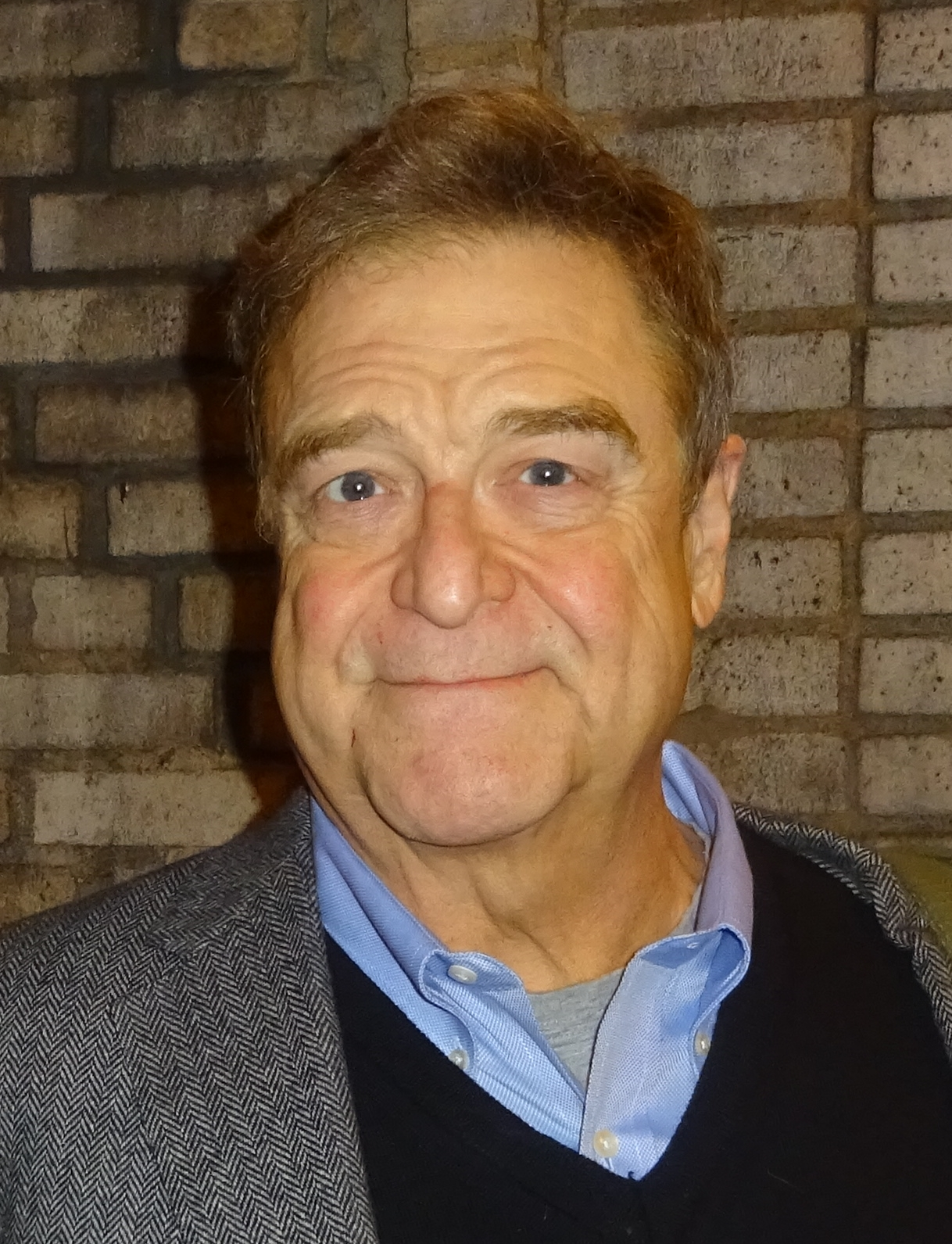
- Goodman in 2016
Awards and nominations
Award	Wins	Nominations
Emmy Awards	1	11
Golden Globes	1	5
SAG Awards	1	4

Totals (Note: Certain award groups do not simply award one winner. They acknowledge several different recipients, have runners-up, and have third place. Since this is a specific recognition and is different from losing an award, runner-up mentions are considered wins in this award tally. For simplification and to avoid errors, each award in this list has been presumed to have had a prior nomination.)
- Wins: 13
- Nominations: 44

John Goodman is an American actor known for his performances in film, television and theatre. He has received various accolades including a Primetime Emmy Award, a Golden Globe Award, and a Screen Actors Guild Awards. He received the Disney Legend Award in 2013.

Goodman became a household name for his portrayal as the family patriarch Dan Conner in the ABC sitcom Roseanne (1988-1997). For the role he earned nominations for seven consecutive Primetime Emmy Awards for Outstanding Lead Actor in a Comedy Series, four Golden Globe Awards for Best Actor – Television Series Musical or Comedy and a Screen Actors Guild Award for Outstanding Actor in a Comedy Series.

For his role as a Nevada judge in the NBC comedy-drama series Studio 60 on the Sunset Strip (2006–2007) he won the Primetime Emmy Award for Outstanding Guest Actor in a Drama Series. He was Emmy-nominated for his portrayals of Huey Long in the TNT drama film Kingfish: A Story of Huey P. Long (1995), Harold "Mitch" Mitchell in the CBS film A Streetcar Named Desire (1995), and the medical technician Neal Nicol in the HBO television film You Don't Know Jack (2010). For the later he was also nominated for the Screen Actors Guild Award for Outstanding Performance by a Male Actor in a Miniseries or Television Movie. He played a fictional Republican senator in the Amazon Prime Video political satire series Alpha House (2013–2014) earning a Satellite Award for Best Actor in a Series, Comedy or Musical.

On film, he gained acclaim for his portrayal of Charlie Meadows in the Joel and Ethan Coen black comedy thriller film Barton Fink (1991) for which he earned a nominations for the Golden Globe Award, the Chicago Film Critics Association, and the New York Film Critics Circle for Best Supporting Actor. He played a film studio boss in the silent film The Artist (2011), makeup artist John Chambers in the Ben Affleck directed historical drama Argo (2012) and Frank King in the Hollywood Blacklist drama Trumbo (2015), each of which earned him nominations along with the cast for the Screen Actors Guild Award for Outstanding Performance by a Cast in a Motion Picture. Goodman also received a star on the Hollywood Walk of Fame on March 10, 2017.

== Major associations ==
=== Emmy Awards ===
Year	Category	Nominated work	Result	Ref.
Primetime Emmy Awards
1989	Outstanding Lead Actor in a Comedy Series	Roseanne (episode: "Dan's Birthday Bash")	Nominated	
1990	Outstanding Lead Actor in a Comedy Series	Roseanne (episode: "Born to Be Wild")	Nominated	
1991	Outstanding Lead Actor in a Comedy Series	Roseanne (episode: "Her Boyfriends Back")	Nominated	
1992	Outstanding Lead Actor in a Comedy Series	Roseanne (episode: "The Back Story")	Nominated	
1993	Outstanding Lead Actor in a Comedy Series	Roseanne (episode: "Terms of Estrangement")	Nominated	
1994	Outstanding Lead Actor in a Comedy Series	Roseanne (episode: "Guilt by Imagination")	Nominated	
1995	Outstanding Lead Actor in a Comedy Series	Roseanne (episode: "The Blaming of the Shrew")	Nominated	
1995	Outstanding Lead Actor in a Miniseries or a Special	Kingfish: A Story of Huey P. Long	Nominated	
1996	Outstanding Supporting Actor in a Miniseries or a Special	A Streetcar Named Desire	Nominated	
2007	Outstanding Guest Actor in a Drama Series	Studio 60 on the Sunset Strip (episode: "Nevada Day")	Won	
2010	Outstanding Supporting Actor in a Miniseries or a Movie	You Don't Know Jack	Nominated	

=== Golden Globe Awards ===
Year	Category	Nominated work	Result	Ref.
1988	Best Actor in a TV Series – Comedy/Musical	Roseanne	Nominated	
1989	Best Actor in a TV Series – Comedy/Musical	Roseanne	Nominated	
1990	Best Actor in a TV Series – Comedy/Musical	Roseanne	Nominated	
1991	Best Supporting Actor in a Motion Picture	Barton Fink	Nominated	
1992	Best Actor – TV Series Comedy/Musical	Roseanne	Won	

=== Screen Actors Guild Awards ===
Year	Category	Nominated work	Result	Ref.
1995	Outstanding Actor in a Comedy Series	Roseanne	Nominated	
2011	Outstanding Actor in a Television Movie or Miniseries	You Don't Know Jack	Nominated	
2012	Outstanding Cast in a Motion Picture	The Artist	Nominated	
2013	Outstanding Cast in a Motion Picture	Argo	Won	
2016	Outstanding Cast in a Motion Picture	Trumbo	Nominated	

== Miscellaneous awards ==
Year	Award	Category	Title	Result
1989	Chicago Film Critics Association Awards	Best Supporting Actor	Sea of Love	Nominated
1989	People's Choice Awards	Favorite Male Performer in a New TV Program	Roseanne	Nominated
1989	American Comedy Awards	Funniest Male Actor in a TV Series	Roseanne	Won
1990	American Comedy Awards	Funniest Male Actor in a TV Series	Roseanne	Won
1991	Saturn Awards	Best Supporting Actor	Arachnophobia	Nominated
1991	Chicago Film Critics Association Awards	Best Supporting Actor	Barton Fink	Nominated
1991	New York Film Critics Circle Awards	Best Supporting Actor	Barton Fink	3rd
1992	Viewers For Quality Television Awards	Best Actor in a Quality Comedy Series	Roseanne	Won
1999	Satellite Awards	Best Supporting Actor – Musical or Comedy	The Big Lebowski	Nominated
2001	People's Choice Awards	Favorite Male Performer in a New Television Series	Normal, Ohio	Nominated
2002	World Soundtrack Awards	Best Original Song Written for a Film	Monsters, Inc.	Won
2004	Nickelodeon Kids' Choice Awards	Favorite Voice from an Animated Movie	The Jungle Book 2	Nominated
2007	TV Land Awards	Favorite Elvis Impersonation	Roseanne	Nominated
2008	TV Land Awards	Innovator	Roseanne	Won
2010	Black Reel Awards	Best Ensemble	The Princess and the Frog	Nominated
2011	Broadcast Film Critics Association Awards	Best Cast	The Artist	Nominated
2011	St. Louis Gateway Film Critics Association Awards	Best Supporting Actor	The Artist	Nominated
2012	20/20 Awards	Best Supporting Actor	Barton Fink	Won
2012	Satellite Awards	Supporting Actor – Motion Picture	Flight	Nominated
2012	St. Louis Gateway Film Critics Association Awards	Best Supporting Actor	Argo	Nominated
2013	Disney Legend Award	Animation – Voice	The Emperor's New Groove; Monsters, Inc. The Princess and the Frog; Monsters University	Won
2014	Satellite Awards	Best Actor – Television Series, Musical or Comedy	Alpha House	Won
2017	Saturn Awards	Best Supporting Actor in a Film	10 Cloverfield Lane	Won

== See also ==
- John Goodman on screen and stage
