= John Goodman =

American actor (born 1952)

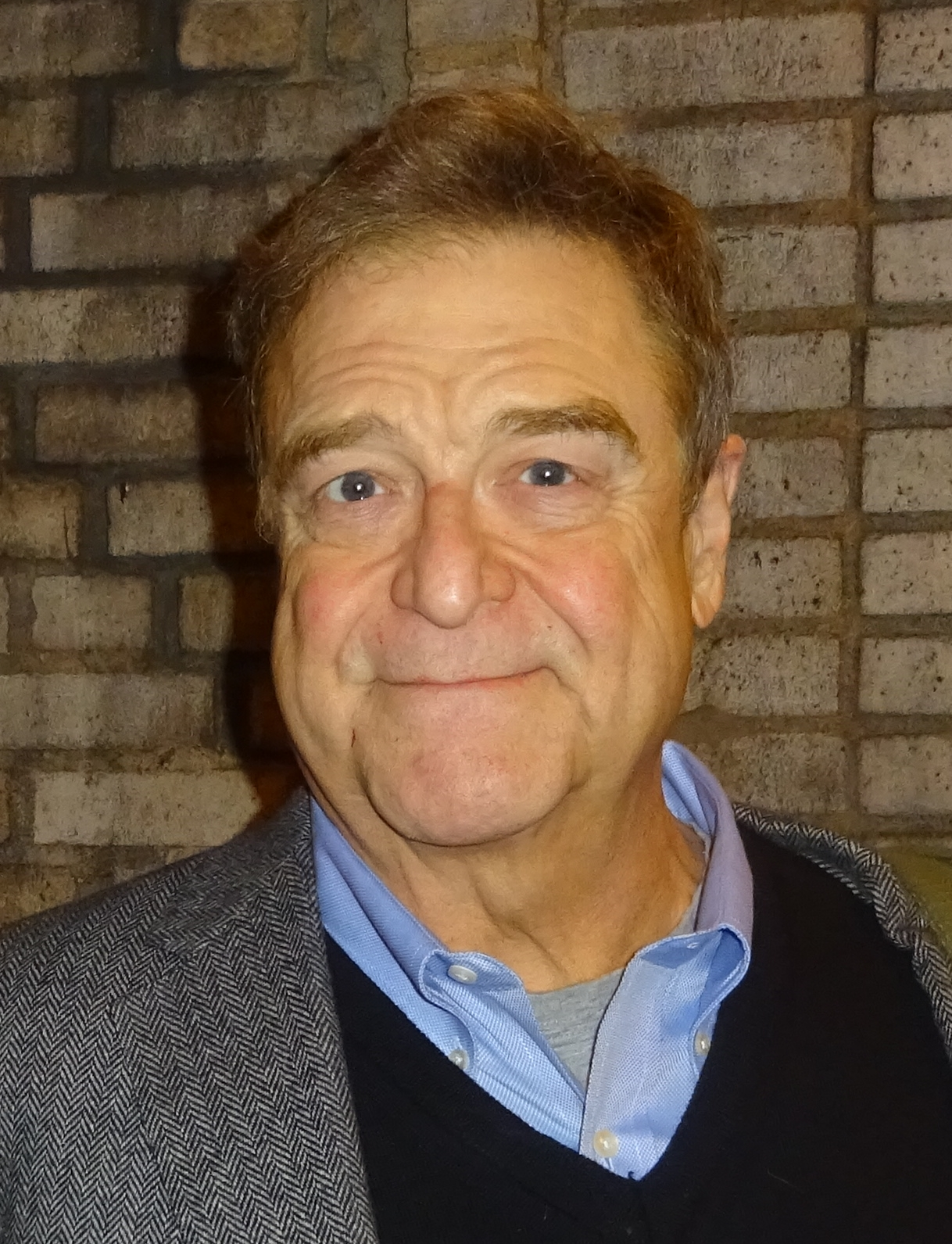
- Goodman in 2016
- Born: John Stephen Goodman; June 20, 1952 (age 74); Affton, Missouri, U.S.
- Education: Southwest Missouri State University (BFA)
- Occupation: Actor
- Years active: 1975–present
- Works: Full list
- Spouse: Anna Beth Hartzog (m. 1989)
- Children: 1
- Awards: Full list

John Stephen Goodman (born June 20, 1952) is an American actor. He rose to prominence in television before becoming an acclaimed and popular film actor, with Vanity Fair calling him "among our very finest actors".

After appearing in films such as Revenge of the Nerds (1984) and True Stories (1986), Goodman gained wide recognition playing the family patriarch Dan Conner in the ABC sitcom Roseanne (1988–1997), for which he received seven Primetime Emmy Award nominations and a Golden Globe Award. The success of the series led to leading roles in films King Ralph (1991), The Babe (1992), Matinee (1993), and The Flintstones (1994). Goodman is also known for his collaborations with the Coen brothers, acting in their films Raising Arizona (1987), Barton Fink (1991), The Big Lebowski (1998), O Brother, Where Art Thou? (2000), and Inside Llewyn Davis (2013). His voice performance roles include Disney's The Emperor's New Groove (2000) and Pixar's Monsters, Inc. franchise (2001–present). Other film roles include Bringing Out the Dead (1999), Speed Racer (2008), The Artist (2011), Flight (2012), Argo (2012), 10 Cloverfield Lane (2016), and Kong: Skull Island (2017).

In 2018, Goodman reprised his role as Dan Conner in Roseanne, and continued to play the character in its spin-off The Conners (2018–2025). He also acted in HBO drama series Treme (2010–2011), FX series Damages (2011), and the HBO comedy series The Righteous Gemstones (2019–2025). He won a Primetime Emmy Award for Studio 60 on the Sunset Strip (2006) and was further Emmy-nominated for Kingfish: A Story of Huey P. Long (1995), A Streetcar Named Desire (1995), and You Don't Know Jack (2010). He is a member of the Five Timers Club having hosted Saturday Night Live 13 times from 1989 to 2013.

Goodman started his career at The Public Theater acting numerous productions including Henry IV, Part 1 (1981), The Skin of Our Teeth (1998), and The Seagull (2001). He made his Broadway debut Big River (1985), for which Goodman received a Drama Desk Award for Outstanding Featured Actor in a Musical nomination. He returned to Broadway in revivals of the Samuel Beckett play Waiting for Godot (2009), and the newspaper comedy The Front Page (2016). Goodman made his West End debut in a revival of David Mamet's American Buffalo (2015).

== Early life and education ==
John Stephen Goodman was born on June 20, 1952 in Affton, Missouri, a suburb of St. Louis. His father, Leslie Francis Goodman, was a postal worker who died of a heart attack when Goodman was two years old. Goodman's mother, Virginia Roos (née Loosmore), was a waitress at Jack and Phil's Bar-B-Que, a retail store worker, and also took in laundry to support the family. Goodman has an older brother, Leslie, who is 14 years his senior, and a younger sister, Elisabeth, who was born six months after his father died. Goodman is of English, German, and Welsh ancestry and was raised Southern Baptist.

Goodman described his childhood as alone and withdrawn after his father had died so early and his brother had left to go to college. Goodman was bullied at school for being overweight. Until ninth grade, Goodman was in the Boy Scouts, which he said offered him the structure and camaraderie he missed; Goodman additionally looked to Boy Scout leaders, and later, acting coaches, as father figures. His brother later returned home to help raise Goodman and his sister. As a child, Goodman spent a lot of time listening to the radio and reading comic books, initially subscribing to DC's Green Lantern and The Atom, before turning to Marvel Comics. He also read his brother's copies of Mad and later confessed to shoplifting its paperback editions. Goodman credits his brother with introducing him to comedy and bebop.

Goodman went to Affton High School, where he played football (offensive guard and defensive tackle) and dabbled in theater. After graduating in 1970, Goodman took a gap year. He earned a football scholarship to Missouri State University (then called Southwest Missouri State University, or "SMSU") in Springfield but tore his ACL before ever suiting-up to go onto the field. Instead, Goodman channeled his energy into the school's theater program.

Goodman pledged Sigma Phi Epsilon fraternity, though he did not join until several years later. Goodman discovered the university's drama program and studied there with future Hollywood stars Kathleen Turner and Tess Harper. In December 2013, Goodman stated his school friends were his closest ones. Goodman graduated with a Bachelor of Fine Arts in 1975, and in 2013, the university presented him with an honorary doctorate degree in humane letters.

== Career ==
=== 1980–1999: Film roles and Roseanne ===
After graduating from SMSU, Goodman relocated to New York City. With a small bankroll from his brother, Goodman found an apartment in Hell's Kitchen near the Theater District and unsuccessfully tried to make money as a bartender and waiter. However, Goodman eventually found modest success in voice-overs, commercials, and plays. He was the person who slapped himself (uttering the tagline, "Thanks... I needed that!") in a television ad for Skin Bracer by Mennen. Goodman also performed off-Broadway and in dinner theaters before landing character roles in film during the early 1980s.

In 1982, Goodman made his film debut with a small role in Eddie Macon's Run. During this period he continued to work on the stage, starring as Pap Finn in Big River from 1985 to 1987. For his role, he received a Drama Desk nomination for Best Featured Actor in a Musical; he is also featured on the Original Broadway Cast Recording. Before landing his big break into movies in 1986 with a significant comedic role in True Stories, he starred in the movie Revenge of the Nerds, and later had a brief cameo as Otis in Sweet Dreams. In the former film, his character Louis Fyne says "I'm 6' 3" and maintain a consistent panda bear shape", establishing his trademark size as an important part of many characters he later played on film and stage.

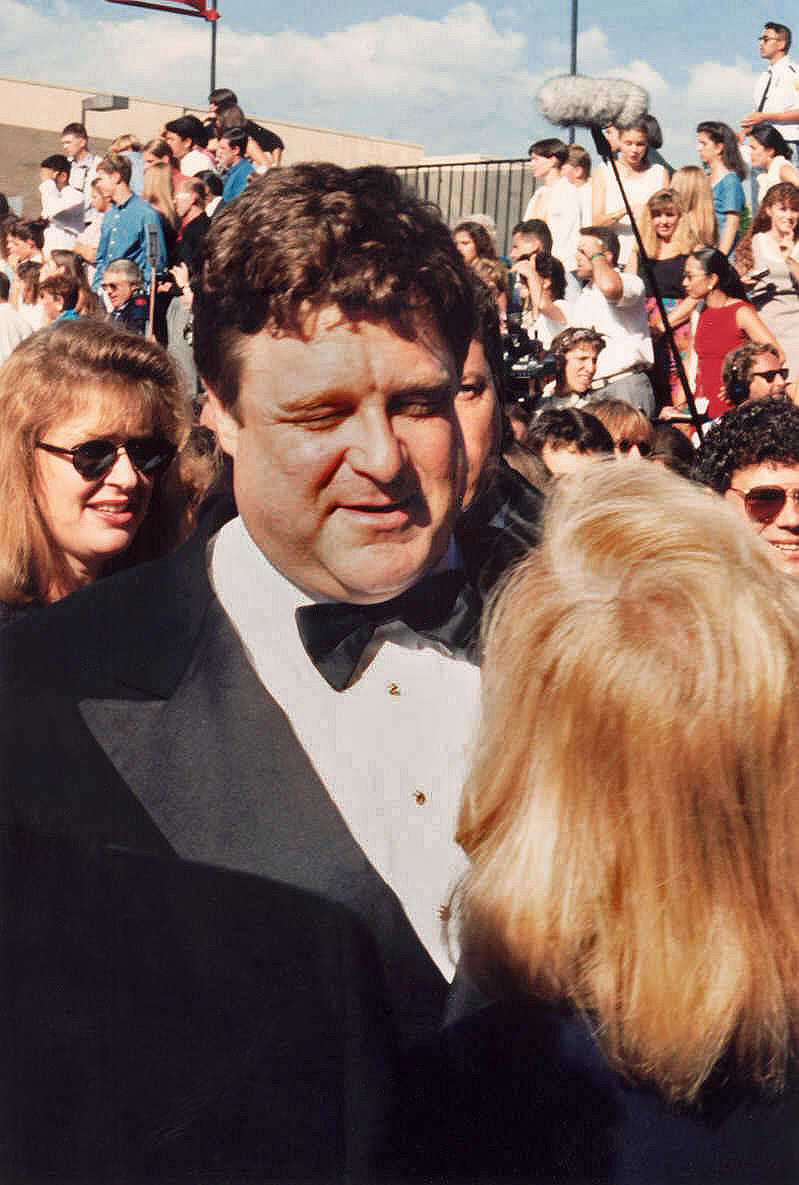
Goodman on the red carpet at the Emmys on September 11, 1994

Goodman rose to fame in acting by playing the role of Dan Conner on the ABC sitcom Roseanne from 1988 to 1997. He returned to the character in 2018 for the revived, 10th season, where he said "Roseanne and I just went back to having a ball", and then stayed on for the show's subsequent spin-off The Conners. Goodman had a long history of appearances on late night comedy shows and was the first guest on Late Night with Conan O'Brien, which won him the series' "First Guest Medal" (Goodman joked he would pawn the medal for a bottle of cheap Scotch). Goodman has hosted NBC's Saturday Night Live 13 times, while also making seven cameo appearances as Linda Tripp during the Monica Lewinsky scandal, three appearances as Rex Tillerson, and cameoing on the season 28 finale hosted by former SNL cast member Dan Aykroyd. With little to no experience in TV comedy, Goodman auditioned to be a cast member for Jean Doumanian's tumultuous 1980–1981 SNL season and was rejected, along with up-and-coming comedians Jim Carrey, Paul Reubens, and Robert Townsend.

Goodman first worked with the Coen brothers on Raising Arizona (1987). He went on to appear in their films Barton Fink (1991), The Big Lebowski (1998), O Brother, Where Art Thou? (2000), and Inside Llewyn Davis (2013). Only Steve Buscemi has appeared in more Coen works (six films), though Frances McDormand and Jon Polito have also appeared in five of their films. He worked with Steven Spielberg on Always (1989) and had a supporting role in Arachnophobia (1990). In 1993, he starred as a William Castle-type filmmaker in Matinee opposite Cathy Moriarty, and in 1994 as Fred Flintstone in The Flintstones. Other films included King Ralph (1991), The Babe (1992), Fallen (1998), Blues Brothers 2000 (1998), and the Martin Scorsese-helmed film Bringing Out the Dead (1999). On making Bringing Out the Dead, Goodman went on to say: "I hate to say this but it was a really low point... I don't remember where I was. I was lost... I couldn't find the character and it's a shame cause we were riding around with Marty all night long in ambulances... My wife came up with my daughter to spend time with me and she immediately got (appendicitis). So we'd find a hospital for her. A friend of mine had to fly up a couple days later to take care of my daughter... I just started breaking down a little bit. I just wasn't there for everybody and I hate that."

=== 2000–2009: Established star ===
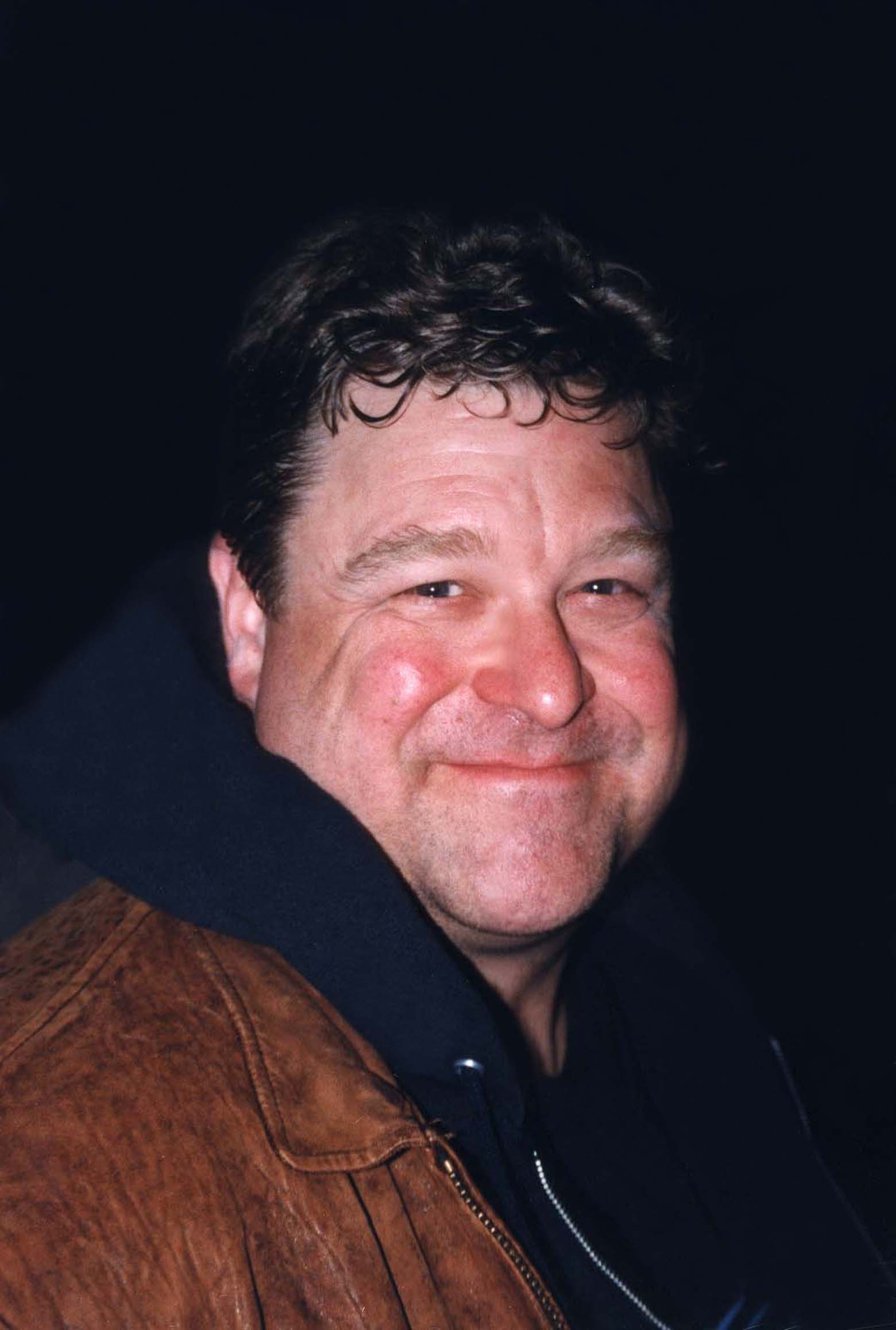
Goodman in 2000

Goodman had guest roles on the Aaron Sorkin television dramas The West Wing and Studio 60 on the Sunset Strip. In the former, he appeared in four episodes, playing Speaker of the House and eventual acting president Glen Allen Walken. In the latter, Goodman appeared as Pahrump, Nevada Judge Robert Bebe, earning a 2007 Emmy for Outstanding Guest Actor – Drama Series for his performance.

Goodman voiced Robot Santa in the character's first appearance on Futurama. Starting in 2007, he has been the voiceover in Dunkin' Donuts commercials. In 2000, Goodman provided the voice of Pacha in Disney's The Emperor's New Groove and, a year later, the voice of James P. "Sulley" Sullivan in Pixar's Monsters, Inc. He returned to the character for the film's 2013 prequel Monsters University (2013), the 2021 Disney+ series Monsters at Work, and for a 2024 update of the video game Disney Dreamlight Valley. In 2007, Goodman voiced Layton T. Montgomery in Bee Movie. Two years later, he voiced "Big Daddy" La Bouff in The Princess and the Frog. Goodman's voice can also be heard on an automated message system at St. Louis Lambert International Airport. He was the original voice of the yellow M&M in 1995 before being replaced by J. K. Simmons the following year.

In theater, Goodman played the Ghost of Christmas Present in the 2008 Kodak Theatre production of A Christmas Carol, starring Christopher Lloyd as Ebenezer Scrooge. Goodman played the role of Pozzo in a Studio 54 revival of Samuel Beckett's play Waiting for Godot, opposite Bill Irwin and Nathan Lane. John Heilpern of Vanity Fair called it "the greatest Pozzo I've ever seen." In 2009, Goodman reprised the role of Pozzo at the Roundabout Theatre Company.

Goodman was cast in In the Electric Mist (2009) as Julie "Baby Feet" Balboni. At one time, he was slated to play the role of Ignatius Reilly, the main character of A Confederacy of Dunces by John Kennedy Toole. The story takes place almost entirely in New Orleans. However, the movie was never put into production. In The Princess and the Frog, Goodman lent his voice as Eli "Big Daddy" La Bouff also takes place in New Orleans. Goodman was also featured in Treme, a drama series focusing on a group of interconnected people trying to rebuild their lives in post–Hurricane Katrina New Orleans. Goodman played Creighton Bernette, a Tulane English professor, in the show's first season. Other films during this time included The Adventures of Rocky and Bullwinkle (2000), Coyote Ugly (2000), Storytelling (2001), Beyond the Sea (2004), Evan Almighty (2007), Speed Racer (2008). Speaking about Speed Racer, Goodman said: "It's hallucinogenic man... To be honest with you it was right before I crashed with the alcohol and I was professional but that's it. I had a ball making it. Wow Berlin, some city... We went to the New York Film Festival with it and I'd seen it before so I went around to different parts of the audience and I went "uh oh"... They weren't as enamored with it as I was."

=== 2010–present ===
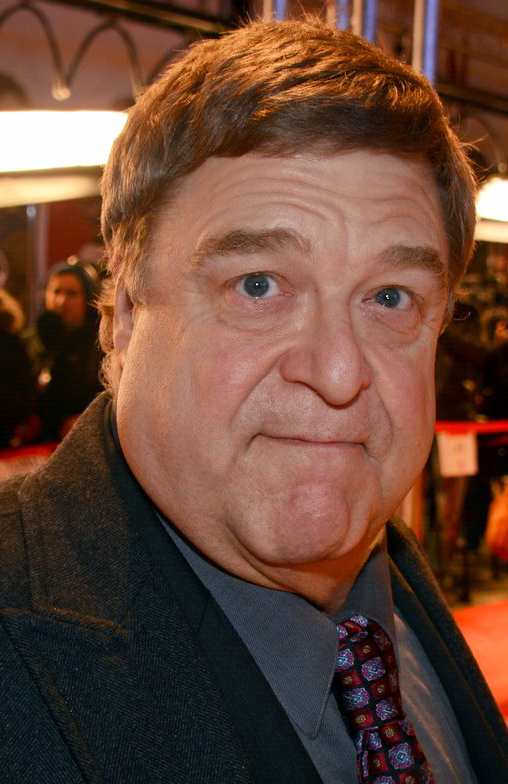
Goodman in 2014

In 2011, Goodman was a guest star on the third season of Community. He also voiced a character in the video game Rage voicing Dan Hagar, and played movie studio chief Al Zimmer in the Academy Award–winning live action film The Artist, as well as Best Picture nominee Extremely Loud & Incredibly Close the same year. Also in 2011, Goodman starred in Kevin Smith's Red State playing ATF Agent Joseph Keenan. In February 2012, it was reported that Goodman would reunite with Roseanne Barr for a new NBC pilot titled Downwardly Mobile. The series would have had Goodman portray a bachelor mechanic who resides in a trailer park, and would have used the standard multiple-camera setup traditionally found in sitcoms; however, the series' option was not picked up by the network.

During this time Goodman took prominent roles in films including Flight (2012), The Hangover Part III (2013), The Monuments Men (2014), Trumbo (2015), 10 Cloverfield Lane (2016), Patriots Day (2016) and Atomic Blonde (2017). Goodman also voiced Hound in Transformers: Age of Extinction (2014) and returned to the character in Transformers: The Last Knight (2017). With his well-received supporting roles in The Artist (2011) and Argo (2012), Goodman accomplished the rare feat of appearing in back-to-back winners of the Academy Award for Best Picture.

On August 10, 2013, Goodman was inducted as a Disney Legend. That same year, he received positive reviews for his performance as U.S. senator from North Carolina Gil John Biggs in Amazon's Alpha House, a political comedy written by Garry Trudeau. In the show, Goodman's character, a retired University of North Carolina at Chapel Hill (UNC) basketball coach, and three other Republican senators share a house on Capitol Hill. The show ended after two seasons in 2014. In April 2015, Goodman made his return to the stage, making his West End debut in the process while starring as Donny in American Buffalo at the Wyndham's Theatre alongside Damian Lewis and Tom Sturridge. Goodman went on to star as Sheriff Hartman in the 2016 Broadway theatre revival of The Front Page, alongside Nathan Lane and John Slattery.

On March 10, 2017, Goodman received a star on the Hollywood Walk of Fame for his work in motion pictures, located at 6767 Hollywood Boulevard. On April 28, 2017, it was announced that a revival of Roseanne was in the works and that Goodman along with most of the original cast and some of the producers would return for the limited series that was being shopped around with ABC and Netflix the frontrunners to land the show. On May 16, 2017, it was confirmed that eight episodes would air mid-season in 2018 on ABC. On May 29, 2018, in the wake of controversial remarks made by Barr on Twitter regarding Valerie Jarrett (an advisor of former president Barack Obama), ABC canceled the revival after a single season. Goodman has stated he "felt bad" for his costar and defended her over the following years, claiming she was not racist. However, he also stated in 2025 that the two of them had not spoken in "seven or eight years," with Goodman doubting Barr would even want to talk to him. The month after the cancellation, ABC ordered a ten-episode Roseanne spin-off titled The Conners, which stars the Roseanne cast sans Roseanne Barr. The show's first season premiered on October 16, 2018.

From 2019 to 2025, Goodman starred in the role of Southern megachurch preacher and family patriarch Eli Gemstone on the HBO comedy The Righteous Gemstones, created by and co-starring Danny McBride. Goodman accepted the role right after the revived Roseanne series had been cancelled and before its spin-off The Conners was announced, which led to Goodman doing both shows. The Righteous Gemstones was renewed for a second season in September 2019. In 2020, Goodman served as the conductor narrator for the virtual train ride welcome video at the St. Louis Aquarium that opened at St. Louis Union Station. In 2023, Goodman appeared in Monarch: Legacy of Monsters as the older Bill Randa, reprising his role from Kong: Skull Island (2017). In 2026, he had a supporting role as Blake Jr, the CEO of a fast-food restaurant chain, in the dark comedy crime film Chili Finger. In September 2026, Goodman was cast as Joey in the third season of the HBO drama series The Last of Us.

== Philanthropy ==
Since Hurricane Katrina, Goodman has appeared in several recovery commercials aired in Louisiana.

In 2010, Goodman appeared in a commercial to raise awareness for the Deepwater Horizon oil spill. Also starring in the commercial were Sandra Bullock, Peyton Manning, Eli Manning, Jack Del Rio, Drew Brees, Emeril Lagasse, James Carville, and Blake Lively.

== Personal life ==
=== Marriage and family ===
In 1989, Goodman married Annabeth Hartzog from Bogalusa, Louisiana. They met at a Halloween party at Tipitina's when he was filming Everybody's All-American in New Orleans. Their daughter, Molly Evangeline Goodman (born 1990), has worked as a production assistant. They have lived for many years in the Garden District of New Orleans, in a home he purchased from musician Trent Reznor. Their second home in the Pacific Palisades neighborhood of Los Angeles was destroyed by the Palisades Fire in January 2025.

=== Beliefs and interests ===
Goodman is a lifelong fan of the St. Louis Cardinals and narrated a 2020 MLB Network documentary about the Cardinals teams of the 1980s.

In 2024, Goodman narrated campaign ads for Democratic candidate Lucas Kunce in the 2024 United States Senate election in Missouri against incumbent Republican Senator Josh Hawley.

=== Health ===
Goodman has been sober since 2007, and tries to attend an Alcoholics Anonymous meeting every morning. In 2009, he said of his struggle with alcoholism, "I don't know how much the old Jackie Daniel's franchise ruined my memory, which is going anyway, because of my advancing decrepitude. I had a 30-year run, and at the end I didn't care about anything. I was just fed up with myself. I didn't even want to be an actor anymore." In 2012, he said, "If I'd picture in my mind a drink—usually straight out of the bottle—I couldn't not do it." He noted that, while acting in plays, he would "have the shakes so bad [he'd] have to have a drink to get through the show" and considered himself lucky that he never got fired. In 2026, Goodman stated he doesn't grill anymore - having grown to associate the activity with drinking.

Goodman was once known for being overweight, at one point weighing close to 400 lb (180 kg). However, by August 2010, he had lost 100 lb (45 kg) through a program of exercise and food journaling. His new figure attracted attention at the Toronto International Film Festival in September 2015 and the BFI London Film Festival the following month. In 2016, Goodman said of his weight loss journey: "I just stopped eating all the time. I’d have a handful of food and it’d go to my mouth. I was just eating all the time. I was just eating alcoholically. In the old days, I would take three months out, lose 60 or 70 pounds, and then reward myself with a 6-pack of Bud or whatever and just go back to my old habits. Then this time I wanted to do it slowly, move, exercise. I’m getting to the age where I can’t afford to sit still anymore. And it gives me the energy to work, ‘cause work is very draining." By June 2024, it was reported that he had lost over 200 lb (90 kg).

Goodman has depression. He has attributed the severity of the condition to past alcohol consumption and treats it through physical exercise.
