= Vel (disambiguation) =

Vel is the divine javelin/spear of the Hindu deity Murugan.

Vel or VEL may refer to the following:

- Vel (symbol), the symbol "∨" used in logic meaning logical disjunction (i.e. "or")
- Vel, Azerbaijan
- Vel blood group, a human blood group implicated in transfusion reactions
- Vela (constellation)
- Vel (film), starring Suriya and Asin
- Vel River (disambiguation)
- Jennifer Vel, Seychellois economist and politician
- Vel Sartha, a Star Wars character introduced in the TV series Andor
- Vel Soap, a soap detergent brand
- Vernal Regional Airport (IATA code VEL)
- Demon Queen "Vel" Velverosa, a character in Mage & Demon Queen
- Sakira Vel, English actress

== See also ==
- Vels (disambiguation)
- Velu (disambiguation)
- Velmurugan (disambiguation)
