= Velmurugan (disambiguation) =

Velmurugan is an Indian singer in Tamil cinema.

Velmurugan may also refer to:

- Velmurugan Thangasamy Manohar Charle, or simply Charle, Indian actor
- T. Velmurugan, Indian politician
- Velmurugan Borewells, a 2014 Indian film

== See also ==
- Vel (disambiguation)
- Murugan (surname)
