= Cindy Morgan =

American actress (1954–2023)

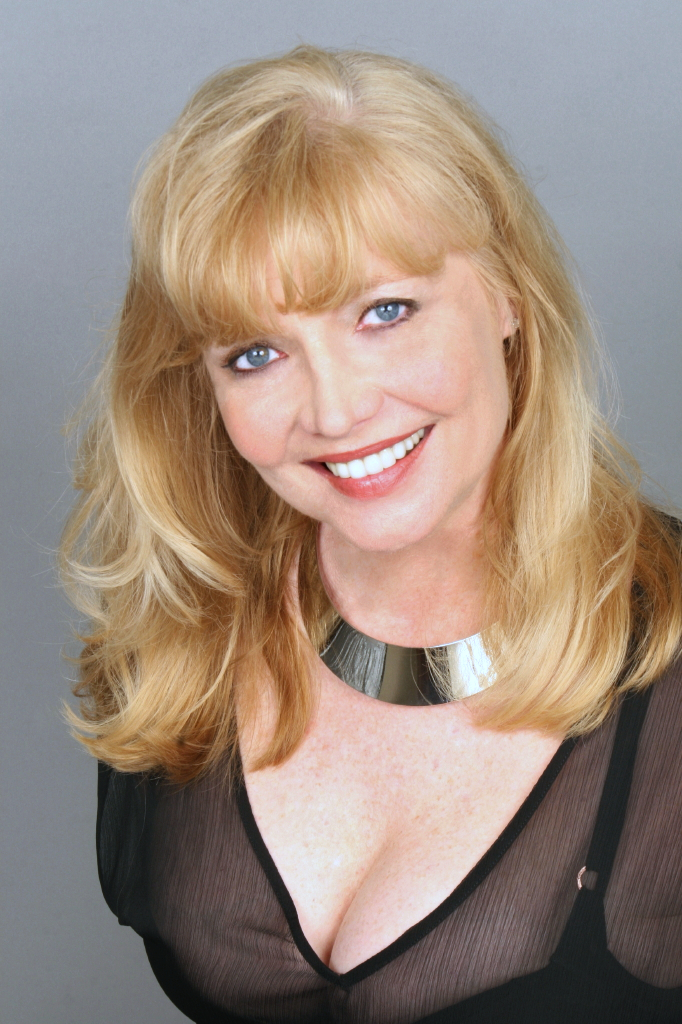
- Morgan in 2012
- Born: Cynthia Ann Cichorski; September 29, 1951; Chicago, Illinois, U.S.
- Died: c. December 30, 2023 (aged 72); Lake Worth Beach, Florida, U.S.
- Education: Northern Illinois University
- Occupation: Actress
- Years active: 1979–2022
- Spouse: Fred Villanueva (m. 1976; div. 1979)
- Website: Cindy-Morgan.com

Cynthia Ann Cichorski (September 29, 1951 (Note: Some sources state 1954 as her date of birth.) – c. December 30, 2023), known professionally as Cindy Morgan, was an American actress best known for playing Lora Baines/Yori in Tron and Lacey Underall in Caddyshack.

== Early life and education ==
Morgan was born as Cynthia Ann Cichorski on September 29, 1951, in Chicago, Illinois, to parents of Polish and German descent. She studied communications at Northern Illinois University.

== Career ==
After graduation, Morgan worked at a television station in Rockford, Illinois, where she was a "weather girl". She kept her hand in radio by working the graveyard shift at a local rock station. She returned to Chicago and deejayed on WSDM until quitting on air during a labor dispute at the station.

Morgan then worked for Fiat Automobiles at car shows. She moved to Los Angeles in 1978 and became a model for Irish Spring soap TV advertisements while attending acting schools and workshops. Other appearances included commercials for Continental Airlines, Wish-Bone salad dressing and Johnson & Johnson suntan lotion.

Morgan landed her first screen role in the 1979 theatrical film, Up Yours, followed by the 1980 comedy Caddyshack, playing the role of sexy bombshell Lacey Underall. In a 2012 interview, Morgan said of the role: "Caddyshack was my first film and I'll say that the end product was so completely different, it was originally about the caddies. So at first, I had nothing to lose to audition. It was fun. All I did was focus on making the person sweat. Look 'em in the eye, do that thing many women know how to ..."

Morgan appeared in the 1982 hit Tron, the first film to feature large scale computer-generated imagery. She played two characters: Lora Baines, a computer programmer in the "real" world, and Yori, her alter-ego in the film's computer world.

Morgan had multiple television and film credits, including portraying two roles on the primetime soap opera Falcon Crest, Lori Chapman in season one and Gabrielle Short in seasons six and seven. Morgan also played two characters, in two episodes, on the television series Matlock. Her other credits include guest and minor appearances on The Larry Sanders Show, Amazing Stories, CHiPs, and a co-starring role on Bring 'Em Back Alive.

Morgan was an associate producer on five films produced by Larry Estes.

According to the documentary Caddyshack: The Inside Story, as of 2009, Morgan was a resident of Florida and working on a book about her experiences during the making of Caddyshack, to be called From Catholic School to Caddyshack.

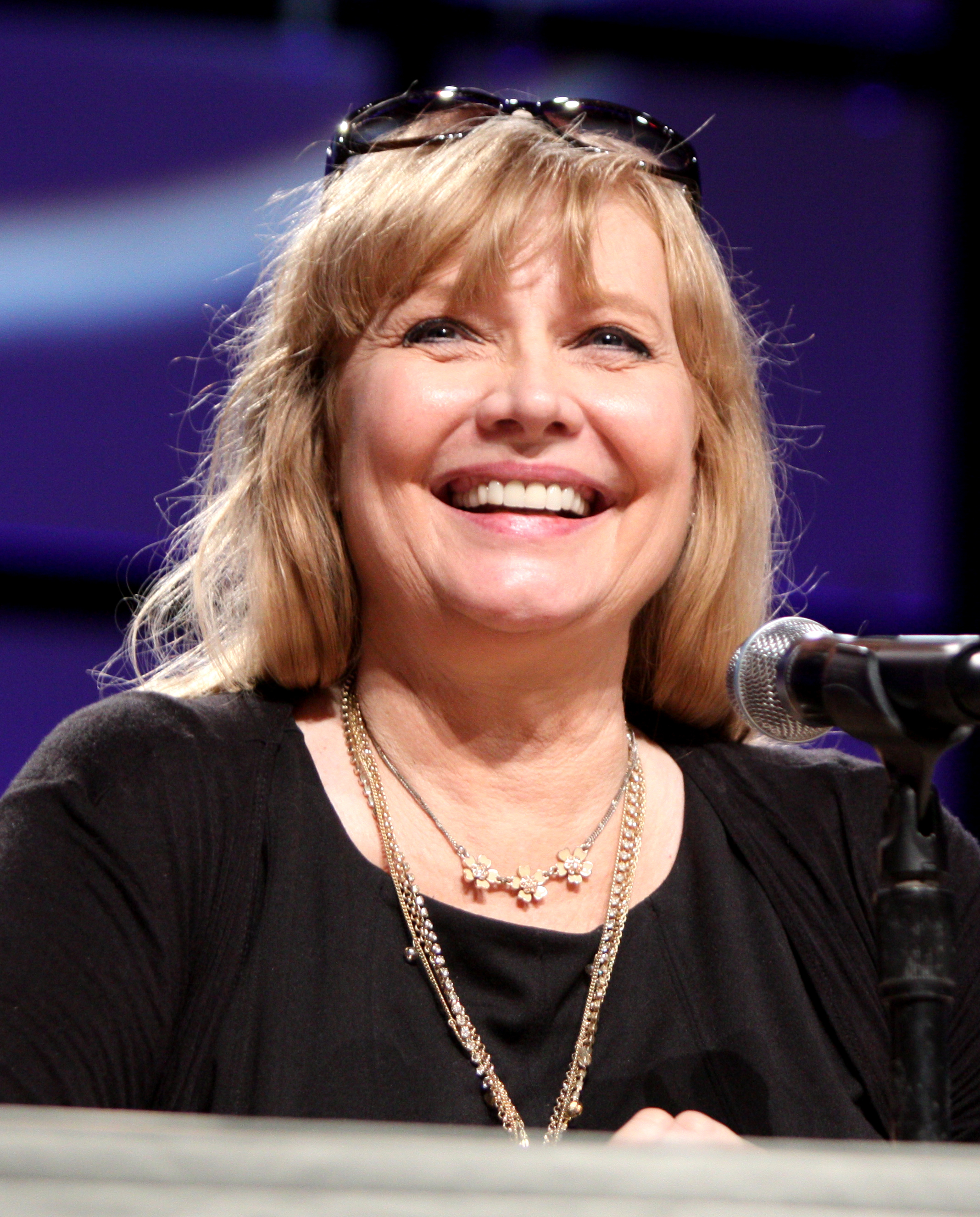
Cindy Morgan at Phoenix Comicon in May 2013

Morgan did not participate in the making of Tron: Legacy, the 2010 sequel to the 1982 film, nor does she appear in any of the retrospective materials produced in conjunction with the sequel for use in a DVD/Blu-ray reissue of the film in 2011. She did reunite with her costar Bruce Boxleitner in character as Lora Baines, in a mock news conference on April 2, 2010, promoting the release of Tron: Legacy.

=== Voice acting ===
In 2003, Morgan voiced Ma3a in Buena Vista Interactive's PC game Tron 2.0.

== Charitable works ==
Morgan, whose father fought in World War II, was passionate about supporting the United States military and helping to alleviate the financial hardship felt by those who served in the wars in Afghanistan and Iraq. She was director of the Caddyshack Reunion Golf Tournament in 2006, which reunited some of the cast of Caddyshack (Morgan included), along with other celebrities. Subtitled "Playing for the Home Team" and hosted at Willow Crest Golf Club in Oak Brook, Illinois, the tournament raised funds (and awareness) to benefit the Illinois Military Family Relief Fund, an organization that helps the families of National Guard members and reservists on active duty. The event, which was held in Oak Brook, Illinois, was sponsored by a corporate partner, which sought to provide direct support but fell short on its goals, leading to a legal dispute over unfulfilled pledges and accounting issues.

== Personal life ==
On July 4, 1976, Morgan married Fred Villanueva. They remained married until their divorce in 1979. In a 2015 interview, Morgan stated that she was considered legally blind without her contact lenses.

=== Death ===
Morgan was found dead of natural causes at her home in Lake Worth Beach, Florida, on December 30, 2023, at the age of 72. Her body was discovered by her roommate who noticed an odor emanating from Morgan's bedroom. The roommate then called 911, which led to deputies from the Palm Beach County Sheriff's Office to the scene where her body was found.

== Filmography ==
=== Film ===
Cindy Morgan film credits
Year	Title	Role	Ref.
1979	Up Yours	Elaine	
1980	Caddyshack	Lacey Underall	
1982	Tron	Lora Baines/Yori	
1994	Silent Fury	Woman	
1995	Galaxis	Detective Kelly	
2006	Open Mic'rs	Cindy Morgan	

=== Television ===
Cindy Morgan television credits
Year	Title	Role	Notes	Ref.
1981	The Love Boat	Tracy Cotts	Episode: "Clothes Make the Girl"	
1981	CHiPs	Jennifer	2 episodes	
1981	Vegas	Margie Jenkins	Episode: "Time Bomb"	
1981	CHiPs	Melanie Mitchell	Episode: "Mitchell & Woods"	
1982–1983	Bring 'Em Back Alive	Gloria Marlowe	12 episodes	
1982	Falcon Crest	Lori	Episode: "For Love or Money"	
1984	Masquerade	Unknown	Episode: "Flashpoint"	
1984	Hawaiian Heat	Sharon	Episode: "Picture Imperfect"	
1985	The Midnight Hour	Vicky Jensen	Television film	
1986	The Fall Guy	Zoe LeRoy	Episode: "No Rms Ocean Vu"	
1986	Tough Cookies	Maggie	Episode: "The Unfantasy"	
1986	Crazy Like a Fox	Unknown	Episode: "The Duke Is Dead"	
1986	Amazing Stories	Beth	Episode: "Hell Toupee"	
1987–1988	Falcon Crest	Gabrielle Short	15 episodes	
1987	Hunter	Carol Benson	Episode: "Hot Prowl"	
1987	Walt Disney's Wonderful World of Color	Laura Wells	Episode: "The Return of the Shaggy Dog"	
1987	Beverly Hills Buntz	Randy	Episode: "Sid and Randy"	
1988–1989	Matlock	Jessie Martin / Linda Hansfield	3 episodes	
1988	The Highwayman	Mink	Episode: "The Billionaire Body Club"	
1988	She's the Sheriff	Samantha	Episode: "Max's Ten"	
1990	Mancuso, FBI	Amanda	Episode: "Adamant Eve"	
1991	Hunter	Paula Allen	Episode: "Room Service"	
1992	Harry and the Hendersons	Julia	Episode: "The Green Eyed Bigfoot"	
1992	The Larry Sanders Show	Karen Jackson	Episode: "The Promise"	
1994	Under Suspicion	Laura Brian	Episode: "Father/Daughter Murder"	
1995	Dead Weekend	Newscaster	Television film	
1995	Amanda & the Alien	Holly Hoedown	Television film	
1995	Out There	Judith Daws	Television film	
