= Baby Magic =

American brand of baby care products

- Product type: Baby care products
- Current owner: Naterra (United States)
- Introduced: 1951; 75 years ago
- Previous owners: Mennen (1951-1992); Colgate-Palmolive (1992-1999; former owner in US only); Playtex (1999-2007; US rights only); Ascendia Brands (2007-2008; US rights only); Naterra (2008-2019)
- Website: http://www.babymagic.com/

Baby Magic is an American brand of baby care products marketed by Naterra in the United States. The brand has traditionally included baby-care items such as baby shampoo, baby lotion, baby soaps, and diaper wipes. In Mexico and Latin America, the brand is marketed by Colgate-Palmolive as Baby Magic Mennen, and includes the similar items. The product design and manufacturing origin vary by country.

== History ==
Mennen produced its first baby care product, baby powder in 1898; its line of baby care products would soon quickly expand. In 1951 Mennen created Baby Magic, its line of products specifically dedicated to baby care. Baby Magic became a popular brand among new parents because of its memorable pink bottle and original baby scent.

In 1992, Mennen was purchased by Colgate-Palmolive. The Baby Magic line was the first to drop the "by Mennen" identification on the packaging. After several years of ownership, C-P sold the US rights to the Baby Magic brand to Playtex in 1999, retaining the branding for the Latin American market. Shortly after the acquisition, the logo changed from “Mennen Baby Magic” to “Playtex Baby Magic”. Playtex aggressively pursued expansion of the Baby Magic brand, introducing new items such as sunscreens, diaper wipes, and a botanical line. In 2002, Playtex relaunched the Baby Magic Brand with a new bottle and new logo. The resulting degradation in sales caused the new packaging to be scrapped although the new logo remained.

In 2007, Ascendia Brands acquired the declining Baby Magic Brand from Playtex to add to its portfolio of brands. In 2008, during the wake of the financial crisis, Ascendia filed for bankruptcy protection.

In October 2008, Naterra acquired Baby Magic from Ascendia.
