= Velu =

Velu or Waylu may refer to:

== People ==
- Suthivelu (1947–2012), Telugu actor
- Velu Nachiyar (1730–1790s), queen regnant of Indian Sivaganga in 1760-1790
- Velu Prabhakaran, Indian filmmaker, cinematographer and actor
- Velu Thampi Dalawa (1765–1809), Dalawa or Prime Minister of the Indian kingdom of Travancore between 1802 and 1809
- E. V. Velu, former minister for Food in Tamil Nadu state of India
- Lucienne Velu (1902–1998), French athlete and basketball player
- R. Velu (born 1940), Indian politician of the Pattali Makkal Katchi (PMK) party
- A. M. Velu, Indian politician
- Velu Muthu Mukandar (died 1855), first Protestant Christian in the Megnanapuram Circle in Tamil Nadu

== Places ==
- Vélu, a commune in northern France
- Velu, Iran (disambiguation)

== Films ==
- Aruva Velu, a 1996 Tamil drama film directed by P. S. Bharathi Kannan
- Maanja Velu, a 2010 Tamil language action film directed by A. Venkatesh

== Others ==
- Velu (genus), an insect genus in the tribe Empoascini
- Murugan, the Hindu deity who carries a spear or "vel"

== See also ==
- Vel (disambiguation)
