= Bambeanos =

Soybean snack food

Bambeanos were a snack developed by Colgate-Palmolive which consisted of roasted and flavored whole soybeans. The product was introduced in 1975 and was discontinued by May 1976, having rapidly gained a reputation for causing excessive flatulence. Bambeanos cost Colgate $750,000 to develop and market before being withdrawn with fewer than 25,000 cases sold. A jury later awarded $571,000 to the roasting contractor, United Roasters, after Colgate’s withdrawal.

The snack has often been described as a commercial failure.
