= Suavitel =

Brand of fabric softeners produced by Colgate-Palmolive

- Product type: fabric softener
- Current owner: Colgate-Palmolive
- Country: Mexico
- Introduced: 1970; 56 years ago
- Related brands: Downy, and Snuggle
- Markets: United States, Canada, Mexico, Argentina, Puerto Rico, Spain, Chile, Colombia, Dominican Republic, Peru, Venezuela, Ecuador, Bolivia, Uruguay, Germany, Guatemala, Costa Rica, Belize, Honduras, Panama, El Salvador, Nicaragua, and Brazil
- Website: https://www.suavitel.com/en-us/

Suavitel is a Mexican brand of fabric softener marketed by Colgate-Palmolive. In some countries it is also known as Softlan, Soflan or Soflan-Suavitel.

== History ==
In the 1970s, Colgate-Palmolive Mexico experienced one of its most important moments, when the economic phenomenon known as the “Mexican Miracle” influenced the growth of the economy. As a result, new productive branches emerged within the company. With diversification underway, the company launched liquid cleansers, creams for skin care, the first shampoo for delicate clothes, and the first fabric softener in Mexico, known as Suavitel.

As of 2003, Suavitel had 60% of the Mexican fabric softener market. In 2009, the brand launched "Suavitel Adiós al Planchado" (in English, Suavitel Goodbye to Ironing).
