= Tree Hut =

Brand of personal care products

- Industry: bath and body care products
- Founded: March 2002
- Parent: Naterra
- Website: www.treehutshea.com

Tree Hut is a Naterra brand line of personal care items, offering a full line of bath and body care products. Tree Hut products claim to provide "intense moisture" through shea butter and oil, an ingredient used in all of their products.

The brand was launched in March 2002, beginning with Shea Body Butter in various scents, and has since extended into a full line of shea-based skin care products, including body scrub, body wash, and body lotion.

In December 2025, Tree Hut updated its brand identity, introducing new packaging and visual design across its products and digital platforms.

Tree Hut products are all made with certified organic shea, natural extracts, and do not contain parabens, DMDM, or petrolatum.

A number of their most popular original product line such as Original Shea, Brazilian Nut, and Kukui Nut have been discontinued and are no longer available.

== See also ==
- Naterra
- Shea butter
