= Protex (soap) =

Brand of soap

Protex is an American brand of soap marketed by Colgate-Palmolive in 1985. Protex soaps are sold in over 56 countries. The soap contains an antibacterial chemical called Trichlorocarbanilide.

BrandActiv distributes the brand since the late 1980s and is available in supermarkets and corner shops.
