= Speed Stick =

Brand of deodorant/antiperspirant

Speed Stick/Lady Speed Stick
- Product type: Deodorant/antiperspirant
- Current owner: Colgate-Palmolive
- Country: United States
- Introduced: 1963 (Speed Stick); 1983 (Lady Speed Stick)
- Markets: Worldwide
- Previous owners: The Mennen Company (1963–1992)
- Tagline: Don't sweat it. Handle it.
- Website: www.speedstick.com

Speed Stick is an American brand of deodorant/antiperspirant produced by multinational healthcare company Colgate-Palmolive. It was formerly known as "Mennen Speed Stick" prior to Colgate-Palmolive's purchase of The Mennen Company. Currently, the products feature the words "by Mennen" in a small font on the label. Speed Stick comes in both deodorant and antiperspirant forms. Speed Stick is both a sponsor and the official antiperspirant of the NHL.

Speed Stick comes in forms for men and women (Lady Speed Stick) and in stronger "24/7" forms. Both Speed Stick and Lady Speed Stick are available in stick and gel form.

Speed Stick product types include 24/7, Pro, Stain Guard, Irish Spring, and Original.

== Sponsors ==
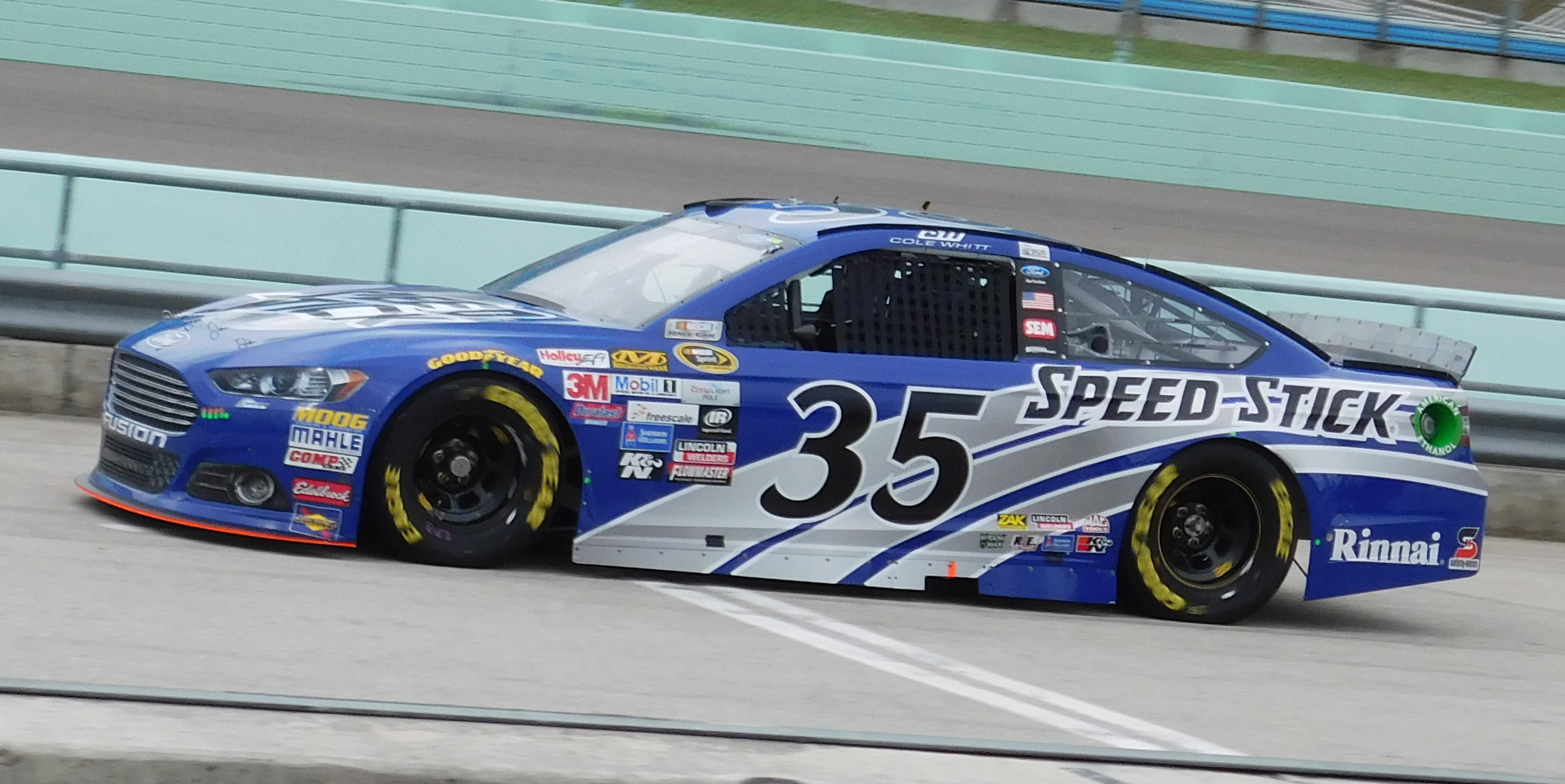
Speed Stick sponsorship of Cole Whitt

Speed Stick was promoted on Between Two Ferns with Zach Galifianakis, in which Zach Galifianakis would abruptly cut an interview in half to promote the product.

Speed Stick bought a 30-second commercial on CBS during Super Bowl XLVII. Since the beginning of 2014, Speed Stick has sponsored NASCAR Sprint Cup Series driver Cole Whitt for at least ten races a year, initially through their GEAR brand until Indianapolis in 2015. This sponsorship has appeared on the cars of four teams that Whitt has driven for in this time, including Swan Racing, BK Racing, Front Row Motorsports and Premium Motorsports.

== See also ==
- Teen Spirit (deodorant)
