= George Henry Lesch =

George Henry Lesch (1909–1994) was the president and CEO of the Colgate-Palmolive company from 1961 to 1974, and was also the chairman of the board of the company from 1961 to 1974. He was featured on the cover of Forbes magazine in 1966.
