= John Goodman on screen and stage =

American actor filmography

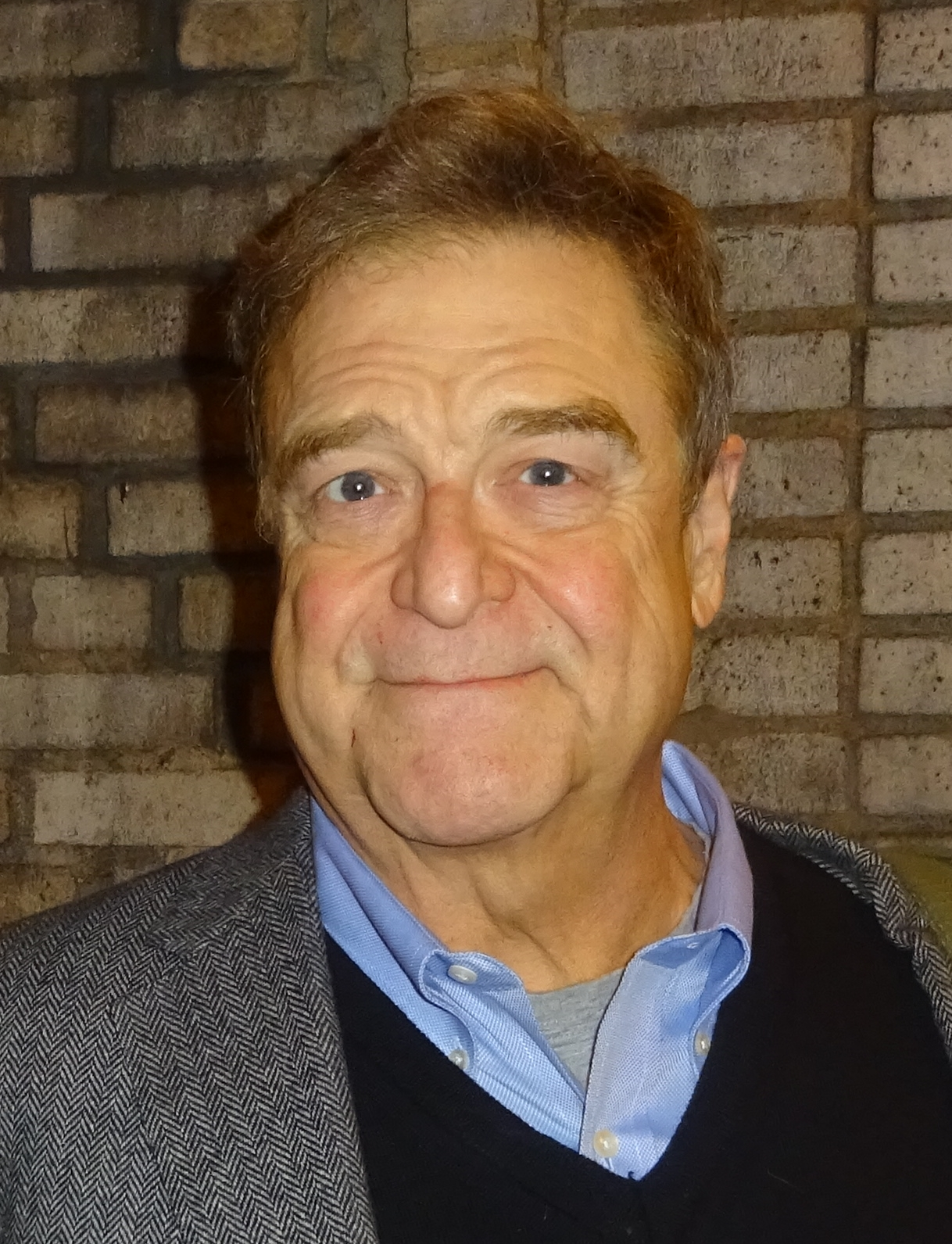
Goodman in 2016

John Goodman is an American actor and singer known for his roles in film, television, voice work and theatre.

Goodman gained national fame for his role as the family patriarch Dan Conner in the ABC television series Roseanne (1988–1997; 2018), for which he won a Golden Globe Award for Best Actor in 1993, and reprised the role in its sequel series The Conners. He is also known as a character actor appearing as a regular collaborator with the Coen brothers. Goodman has appeared in six of their films Raising Arizona (1987), Barton Fink (1991), The Hudsucker Proxy (1994), The Big Lebowski (1998), O Brother, Where Art Thou? (2000), and Inside Llewyn Davis (2013).

Goodman's other film performances include lead roles in Stella (1990), King Ralph (1991), The Babe (1992), The Flintstones (1994), Blues Brothers 2000 (1998), and 10 Cloverfield Lane (2016), and supporting roles in True Stories (1986), Storytelling (2001), Beyond the Sea (2004), Evan Almighty (2007), Speed Racer (2008), Pope Joan (2009), The Artist (2011), Argo (2012), The Hangover Part III (2013), The Monuments Men (2014), Trumbo (2015), Patriots Day (2016), and Atomic Blonde (2017).

Goodman's voice roles include We're Back! A Dinosaur's Story (1993), The Emperor's New Groove (2000), Pixar's Monsters, Inc. franchise (2001–present), The Jungle Book 2 (2003), Clifford’s Really Big Movie (2004), Bee Movie (2007), The Princess and the Frog (2009), the Transformers franchise (2014-present) and Smurfs (2025).

On television, Goodman has starred in the Amazon Studios political comedy series Alpha House (2012–2013), the first season of HBO's Treme (2010–2011), the NBC sitcom Community, and the HBO comedy The Righteous Gemstones (2019–2025). He is also known as a frequent host of Saturday Night Live having served as a host 13 times.

== Filmography ==
Key
†	Denotes films that have not yet been released

=== Film ===
Year	Title	Role	Notes	Ref.
1983	Eddie Macon's Run	Herbert		
1983	The Survivors	Commando		
1984	Crackers	Cracker		
1984	C.H.U.D.	Cop in Diner		
1984	Maria's Lovers	Frank		
1984	Revenge of the Nerds	Coach Harris		
1985	Sweet Dreams	Otis		
1986	True Stories	Louis Fyne		
1987	The Big Easy	Detective Andre DeSoto		
1987	Raising Arizona	Gale Snoats		
1987	Burglar	Detective Nyswander		
1988	The Wrong Guys	Duke Earle		
1988	Punchline	John Krytsick		
1988	Everybody's All-American	Edward Lawrence		
1989	Sea of Love	Detective Sherman Touhey		
1989	Always	Al Yackey		
1990	Stella	Ed Munn		
1990	Arachnophobia	Delbert McClintock		
1991	King Ralph	Ralph Hampton Gainesworth Jones		
1991	Barton Fink	Charlie Meadows / Karl Mundt		
1992	The Babe	George Herman "Babe" Ruth		
1993	Matinee	Lawrence Woolsey		
1993	Born Yesterday	Harry Brock		
1993	We're Back! A Dinosaur's Story	Rex the Tyrannosaurus Rex	Voice	
1994	The Hudsucker Proxy	Newsreel Announcer	Credited as Karl Mundt	
1994	The Flintstones	Fred Flintstone		
1996	Pie in the Sky	Alan Davenport		
1996	Mother Night	Major Frank Wirtanen		
1997	The Borrowers	Ocious P. Potter		
1998	Fallen	Detective "Jonesy" Jones		
1998	Blues Brothers 2000	Mack "Mighty Mack" McTeer		
1998	The Big Lebowski	Walter Sobchak		
1998	Dirty Work	Mayor Adrian Riggins	Uncredited	
1998	Rudolph the Red-Nosed Reindeer: The Movie	Santa Claus	Voice	
1998	The Real Macaw	Mac the Parrot	Voice; US version	
1999	The Runner	Deepthroat		
1999	Bringing Out the Dead	Larry Verber		
1999	The Jack Bull	Judge Joe B. Tolliver		
2000	What Planet Are You From?	Roland Jones		
2000	O Brother, Where Art Thou?	Daniel "Big Dan" Teague		
2000	The Adventures of Rocky and Bullwinkle	Oklahoma Highway Patrol Officer	Cameo	
2000	Coyote Ugly	William James Sanford		
2000	The Emperor's New Groove	Pacha	Voice	
2001	My First Mister	Benjamin Wilson		
2001	One Night at McCool's	Detective Dehling		
2001	Storytelling	Marty Livingston	Segment: "Non-Fiction"	
2001	Happy Birthday	The Dean		
2001	Monsters, Inc.	James P. "Sulley" Sullivan	Voice	
2002	Mike's New Car	James P. "Sulley" Sullivan	Voice; Short film	
2002	Dirty Deeds	Tony Testano		
2003	Masked and Anonymous	Uncle Sweetheart		
2003	The Jungle Book 2	Baloo	Voice	
2004	Freshman Orientation	Rodney		
2004	Clifford's Really Big Movie	George Wolfsbottom	Voice	
2004	Beyond the Sea	Steve "Boom-Boom" Blauner		
2005	Marilyn Hotchkiss' Ballroom Dancing and Charm School	Steve Mills		
2005	Kronk's New Groove	Pacha	Voice; Direct-to-DVD	
2006	Cars	James P. "Sulley" Sullivan Truck	Voice; Cameo	
2006	Tales of the Rat Fink	Ed "Big Daddy" Roth	Voice; Documentary film	
2007	Death Sentence	"Bones" Darley		
2007	Evan Almighty	Congressman Chuck Long		
2007	Bee Movie	Layton T. Montgomery	Voice	
2008	Speed Racer	Pops Racer		
2008	Gigantic	Al Lolly		
2009	Confessions of a Shopaholic	Graham Bloomwood		
2009	In the Electric Mist	Julie "Baby Feet" Balboni		
2009	Alabama Moon	Mr. Wellington		
2009	Beyond All Boundaries	Captain Edwin Simmons	Voice; Short film	
2009	The Princess and the Frog	Eli "Big Daddy" La Bouff	Voice	
2009	Pope Joan	Pope Sergius II		
2009	Drunkboat	Mr. Fletcher		
2010	The Big Uneasy	Narrator		
2011	The Artist	Al Zimmer		
2011	Red State	Joseph Keenan		
2011	Ole War Skule: The Story of Saturday Night	Narrator	Documentary film	
2011	Extremely Loud & Incredibly Close	Stan, The Doorman		
2012	ParaNorman	Mr. Prendergast	Voice	
2012	The Campaign	Scott Talley	Cameo	
2012	Trouble with the Curve	Pete Klein		
2012	Argo	John Chambers		
2012	Flight	Harling Mays		
2013	Inside Llewyn Davis	Roland Turner		
2013	The Hangover Part III	Marshall		
2013	The Internship	Sammy Boscoe	Uncredited	
2013	Monsters University	James P. "Sulley" Sullivan	Voice	
2014	The Monuments Men	Captain Walter Garfield		
2014	Party Central	James P. "Sulley" Sullivan	Voice; Short film	
2014	Transformers: Age of Extinction	Hound	Voice	
2014	The Gambler	Frank "Little Frank"		
2015	Curious George 3: Back to the Jungle	Hal Houston	Voice; Direct-to-DVD	
2015	Trumbo	Frank King		
2015	Love the Coopers	Sam Cooper		
2016	10 Cloverfield Lane	Howard Stambler		
2016	Ratchet & Clank	Grimroth	Voice	
2016	Patriots Day	Ed Davis		
2017	Bunyan and Babe	Paul Bunyan	Voice	
2017	Kong: Skull Island	William "Bill" J. Randa		
2017	Atomic Blonde	CIA Agent Emmett Kurzfeld		
2017	Once Upon a Time in Venice	Dave Phillips		
2017	Transformers: The Last Knight	Hound	Voice	
2017	Valerian and the City of a Thousand Planets	Igon Siruss	Voice	
2019	Captive State	William Mulligan		
2019	Easy Does It	"Catfish" Crawford	Voice	
2022	Take Me to the River: New Orleans	Narrator	Documentary film	
2023	Please Don't Destroy: The Treasure of Foggy Mountain	Narrator		
2025	Smurfs	Papa Smurf	Voice	
2026	Chili Finger	Blake Junior		
2026	Digger	President Compson		
2027	Skeletons †	TBA	Filming	

=== Television ===
Year	Title	Role	Notes	Ref.
1980	The Mystery of the Morro Castle	Telegraph Operator	Television film / Documentary	
1983	The Face of Rage	Fred	Television film	
1983	Heart of Steel	Raymond Bohupinsky	Television film	
1983	Chiefs	Newt "Tub" Murray	Episode: "Part 3"	
1987	The Equalizer	Harold Winter	Episode: "Re-Entry"	
1987	Moonlighting	Donald Chase	Episode: "Come Back Little Shiksa"	
1987	Murder Ordained	Hugh Rayburn	Television film	
1988–1997, 2018	Roseanne	Dan Conner	220 episodes	
1989–2013	Saturday Night Live	Himself / Host	13 episodes	
1990	Grand	"Red"	Episode: "The Healing"	
1992	The Jackie Thomas Show	Dan Conner	Episode: "The Joke"	
1992	Frosty Returns	Frosty the Snowman	Voice; TV special	
1993	Grace Under Fire	Police Officer	Episode: "Pilot"; Uncredited	
1994	Sesame Street	Himself	2 episodes	
1995	Kingfish: A Story of Huey P. Long	Huey Long	Television film	
1995	A Streetcar Named Desire	Harold "Mitch" Mitchell	Television film	
1997–1998	Soul Man	Captain Stan Hamel	2 episodes	
1999	The Simpsons	Meathook	Voice; Episode: "Take My Wife, Sleaze"	
1999	Futurama	Robot Santa	Voice; Episode: "Xmas Story"	
1999–2000	Now and Again	Michael Wiseman	2 episodes	
2000	Pigs Next Door	Phil Stymington	Voice; 13 episodes	
2000	Normal, Ohio	William "Butch" Gamble	13 episodes	
2001	When Dinosaurs Roamed America	The Narrator	Voice; Television film	
2001	Ed	Rudy "Big Rudy"	Episode: "Loyalties"	
2003–2004	The West Wing	Speaker Glen Allen Walken	4 episodes	
2004–2005	Father of the Pride	Larry	Voice; 15 episodes	
2004–2005	Center of the Universe	John Barnett	12 episodes	
2006	Studio 60 on the Sunset Strip	Judge Bobby Bebe	2 episodes	
2006	Odd Job Jack	Garbage Czar	Voice; Episode: "The Big Dump"	
2006	The Year Without a Santa Claus	Santa Claus	Television film	
2007	King of the Hill	Tommy	Voice; Episode: "SerPUNt"	
2007–2008	The Emperor's New School	Pacha	Voice; 16 episodes	
2010	You Don't Know Jack	Neal Nicol	Television film	
2010–2011	Treme	Creighton Bernette	13 episodes	
2011	Damages	Howard T. Erickson	10 episodes	
2011–2012	Community	Vice Dean Robert Laybourne	6 episodes	
2012, 2019	SpongeBob SquarePants	Santa Claus / Himself	Voice; Episode: "It's a SpongeBob Christmas!"; Live-action; Episode: "SpongeBob's Big Birthday Blowout"	
2013	Dancing on the Edge	Masterson	5 episodes	
2013–2014	Alpha House	Gil John Biggs	21 episodes	
2016–2018	Saturday Night Live	Rex Tillerson	3 episodes	
2018	Black Earth Rising	Michael Ennis	8 episodes	
2018–2025	The Conners	Dan Conner	112 episodes	
2019–2025	The Righteous Gemstones	Eli Gemstone	35 episodes	
2020	Birds of a Different Game: The 80's Cardinals	The Narrator	Voice; Documentary	
2020–present	The Freak Brothers	Freddy "Fat Freddy"	Voice; 22 episodes	
2021–2024	Monsters at Work	James P. "Sulley" Sullivan	Voice; 18 episodes	
2023–2024	Monarch: Legacy of Monsters	Older Bill Randa	2 episodes	
2027	The Last of Us †	Joey	Guest (season 3)	

=== Video games ===
Year	Title	Voice role
1994	The Flintstones	Fred Flintstone
1996	Pyst	King Mattruss (live-action)
2001	The Emperor's New Groove: Groove Center	Pacha
2002	Mike's Monstrous Adventure	James P. "Sulley" Sullivan
2002	Monsters, Inc. Scream Arena	James P. "Sulley" Sullivan
2007	Bee Movie Game	Layton T. Montgomery
2007	Cars Mater-National Championship	James P. "Sulley" Sullivan Truck
2009	Cars Race-O-Rama	James P. "Sulley" Sullivan Truck
2011	Rage	Dan Hagar
2018	Lego The Incredibles	James P. "Sulley" Sullivan
2023	Disney Dreamlight Valley	James P. "Sulley" Sullivan

== Theatre ==
Year	Title	Role	Venue	Ref(s)
1975	Destry Rides Again	Tom Destry	Tent Theatre, SMSU	
1977	The Robber Bridegroom	Little Harp	North American Tour	
1979	Loose Ends	(Replacement performer)	Circle in the Square Theatre, Broadway	
1981	Henry IV Part I	Blunt	Delacorte Theater, New York	
1983	Triple Feature	Winninger (Half)	Stage 73, New York	
1983	The Palace of Amateurs		Plaza Theatre, Dallas, Texas	
1984	At Home	Ted	Ensemble Studio Theatre, Off-Broadway	
1984–1985	Big River	Pap Finn	American Repertory Theater, Cambridge, Massachusetts; La Jolla Playhouse, San Diego; Eugene O'Neill Theatre, Broadway	
1987	Antony and Cleopatra	Enobarbus	Los Angeles Theatre Center	
1995	Henry IV, Part I and Part II	Falstaff	Old Globe Theatre, San Diego	
1998	The Skin of Our Teeth	Mr. Antrobus	Delacorte Theater, New York	
2001	The Seagull	Shamrayev	Delacorte Theater, New York	
2002	The Resistible Rise of Arturo Ui	Emanuele Giri	Michael Schimmel Center for the Arts, New York	
2005	Cat on a Hot Tin Roof	Big Daddy	The Geffen Playhouse, Los Angeles	
2008	A Christmas Carol	Ghost of Christmas Present	Kodak Theatre, Los Angeles	
2009	Waiting for Godot	Pozzo	Studio 54, Broadway	
2015	American Buffalo	Donny	Wyndham's Theatre, West End	
2016–2017	The Front Page	Sheriff Hartman	Broadhurst Theatre, Broadway	

== Music ==
Year	Song	Album
2018	"Guv'ment"	King of the Road: A Tribute to Roger Miller
