= Ultra Brite =

American toothpaste brand

Ultra Brite is an American brand of toothpaste and tooth-whitener marketed by Colgate-Palmolive in the United States. Marketed as a whitening toothpaste, its active ingredients are baking soda, hydrogen peroxide and sodium monofluorophosphate.

Colgate-Palmolive introduced Ultra Brite toothpaste in 1967. Ultra Brite gained popularity at the time of its launch with a television and print commercial ad campaign, aimed at Baby Boomers, that stated, "Ultra Brite gives your mouth...[bling]...sex appeal!" It was introduced as an imitator of Maclean's adult toothpaste, but was soon reformulated with a peppermint flavor to give it a more pleasant taste. The paste was sold in the United Kingdom from the late 1970s, but was withdrawn in the 2000s owing to competitive pressures.

In recent years, Ultra Brite has been marketed as an ultra low-budget toothpaste, with it generally having a lower unit cost than mainline Colgate toothpaste.
