= Fresh Start (detergent) =

Powdered detergent

Fresh Start was the first powdered detergent to come in a plastic bottle. It was also one of the first detergents to be highly concentrated, before all detergents went concentrated.

Fresh Start was a product of the Colgate-Palmolive company and was introduced in the late '70s. In 2005, Colgate-Palmolive sold the North American rights for Fresh Start to Phoenix Brands. The target audience of Fresh Start was mainly active women. Advertisements from that time also depict active women having fun without worrying about laundry.
