= Irish Spring =

American brand of deodorant soap

- Logo since 2022

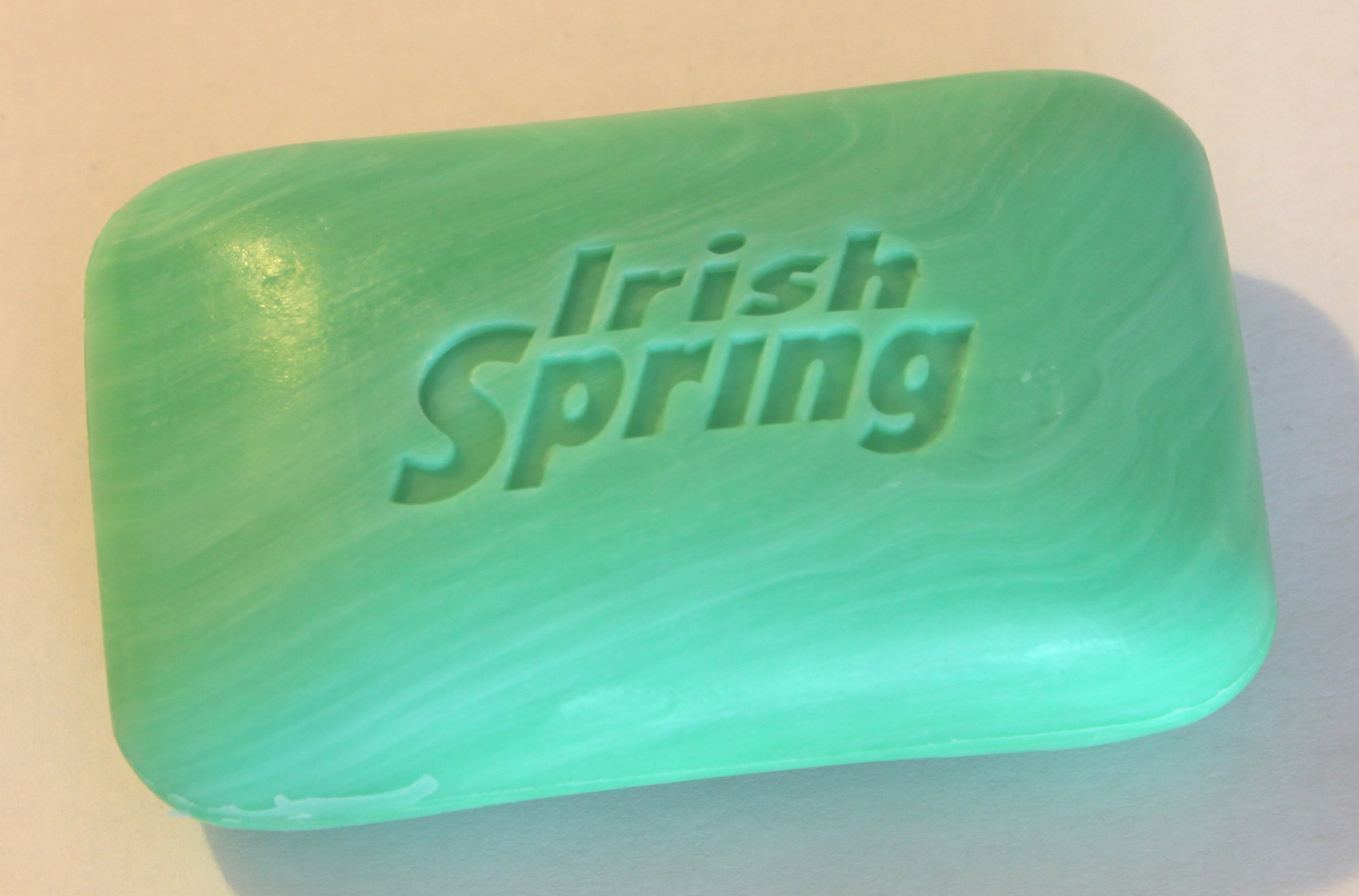
- Irish Spring green soap
- Product type: Deodorant soap
- Current owner: Colgate-Palmolive
- Country: United States
- Introduced: 1970; 56 years ago
- Markets: Worldwide
- Website: www.irishspring.com

Irish Spring is an American brand of deodorant soap owned by Colgate-Palmolive. It was first introduced in Germany in 1970.

== History ==
Irish Spring was launched in Germany in 1970 and in the US in 1972. Until 1990, Irish Spring soap bars only came in one scent (known internally as "Ulster Fragrance"), but the Colgate company has since branched out into several niche varieties and scents. Irish Spring deodorants and shaving products were manufactured until the 1980s. In 2007, Irish Spring body wash was introduced. In addition, in 2011, Irish Spring deodorant was reintroduced as part of Colgate-Palmolive's Speed Stick brand of products.

In 1986, the soap changed its formula, included a different scent, and added skin conditioners.

The soap line underwent rebranding in February 2022, which saw the original variant renamed to "Original Clean," and debuted with a new logo and redesigned packaging designed by agencies Chase Design Group and Tin Horse.

== Variants ==
Irish Spring currently has ten variants:

- Original Clean
- Moisture Blast
- Active Scrub
- 5 in 1
- Charcoal Refresh
- Aloe Mist
- Ultimate Wake Up
- Black Mint
- Sage & Cedar
- Mountain Chill

Irish Spring also has three “natural” variants:

- Relaxing Sandalwood & Hemp
- Exfoliating Salt & White Birch
- Hydrating Eucalyptus & Mint
