= Soaky =

Bubble bath brand

Soaky was the name of a brand of bubble bath produced by Colgate-Palmolive. The product was referred to as "The Fun Bath" on its label and was targeted at young children.

Soaky's major selling point was that the bottles the bubble bath came in could be reused as toy figures once the contents were used up. The brand's mascot was a young boy named The Soaky Kid.

The product's popularity peaked in the 1960s, during which time Colgate-Palmolive was able to secure licenses to use popular cartoon characters to sell Soaky. These included, but were not limited to, Bugs Bunny, Casper the Friendly Ghost, Mickey Mouse, Pluto, Rocky the Flying Squirrel, Bullwinkle J. Moose, and The Chipmunks. Colgate-Palmolive even went as far as to release a special promotional greeting card featuring the Chipmunks that doubled as a playable record. The combination of the promotional methods led the product to take a large share of the children's bath products market.
