= Cold Power =

Brand of laundry detergent

Cold Power is an American brand of laundry detergent by Colgate-Palmolive. It was originally sold in the United States during the 1960s and into the early to mid -1980s, but the brand was discontinued due to lagging sales. The brand is still being sold in Australia, New Zealand, South Africa and many other countries. The name is derived from the fact that it is advertised as washing clothes well in cold water. The product was test marketed in northern New Jersey, specifically an ad campaign was promoted in Chester, N.J., which depicted local housewives Including the then Chester Borough mayor's wife, Jane Van Over Filiberto, who used the product and gave testimonials for television ads.

In Canada, it was marketed under the name 'Arctic Power' and is still being sold.

In May 2015, Cold Power, along with other Colgate-Palmolive's detergent brands in Australia and New Zealand was sold to German company Henkel for €220 million.
