= Bring 'Em Back Alive (TV series) =

American adventure television series

- Main title
- Created by: George Schenck; Frank Cardea
- Starring: Bruce Boxleitner; Clyde Kusatsu; Cindy Morgan; Ron O'Neal
- Composer: Arthur B. Rubinstein
- Country of origin: United States
- Original language: English
- No. of seasons: 1
- No. of episodes: 17

Production
- Executive producers: Larry A. Thompson; Jay Bernstein
- Running time: 60 minutes
- Production companies: Schenck/Cardea Productions; Thompson/Bernstein/Boxleitner Productions; Columbia Pictures Television

Original release
- Network: CBS
- Release: September 24, 1982 – May 31, 1983

Bring 'Em Back Alive is an adventure television series starring Bruce Boxleitner, Cindy Morgan, and Ron O'Neal.

== Premise ==
Frank Buck is a big game trapper and collector of wild animals who works out of the Raffles Hotel bar in Singapore during the 1930s, fighting a range of villains in pre-war Malaysia. He is assisted in his adventures by U.S. Consul Gloria Marlowe, and Ali, Buck's friend and number-one boy.

== Cast ==
- Bruce Boxleitner as Frank Buck, big game trapper and collector of wild animals
- Cindy Morgan as Gloria Marlowe, United States Consul, Singapore
- Clyde Kusatsu as Ali, Buck's friend and number-one boy
- Ron O'Neal as H.H., His Royal Highness, the Sultan of Johore
- Sean McClory as Myles Delaney, manager of the Raffles Hotel
- John A. Zee as G.B. Von Turgo, smuggler and kingpin of the Singapore underworld
- Harvey Jason as Bhundi
- George Lazenby as Captain Hayward, Head of the Palace Guard

== Production ==
The show was based on a 1930 book, Bring 'Em Back Alive, written by well-known big-game trapper Frank Buck. Buck appeared in several movies, including a 1932 adaptation of the book, and is remembered by serial fans as the star of Jungle Menace. Set in Singapore, it was one of several shows, along with the likes of Tales of the Gold Monkey, to try to capitalize on the public's renewed interest in old adventure serials catalyzed by the cinematic success of Raiders of the Lost Ark. The show often hearkened back to the cliffhanger endings of serial installments by having a cliffhanger before a commercial such as Buck's truck literally going off a cliff, then after the commercial break showing him jumping from the truck before it went over. Bruce Boxleitner and Cindy Morgan were cast after having co-starred together in the Walt Disney Productions feature film Tron the same year.

== Broadcast ==
The series was shown in the United States from September 1982 to May 1983. The television series lasted only 17 episodes before being cancelled because of low ratings. The show was scheduled against NBC's top-10 hit The A-Team (which debuted midseason), and ABC's top-30 hits Happy Days and Laverne & Shirley (the latter of which was also cancelled at the end of that season).

== Episodes ==
No.	Title	Directed by	Written by	Original release date
1	"Bring 'Em Back Alive"	E.W. Swackhamer	Story by : George Schenck & Frank Cardea; Teleplay by : George Schenck & Frank Cardea & Tom Sawyer	September 24, 1982
2	"Seven Keys to Singapore"	Bob Kelljan	Tom Sawyer	September 28, 1982
3	"There's One Born Every Minute"	Paul Krasny	George Schenck & Frank Cardea	October 5, 1982
4	"The Reel World of Frank Buck"	Don Weis	B. W. Sandefur	October 12, 1982
5	"The Pied Piper"	Mike Vejar	Story by : Hamilton Berg; Teleplay by : Hamilton Berg & Arthur Weingarten	October 19, 1982
6	"The Warlord"	Bob Sweeney	Billy Marks	October 26, 1982
7	"Thirty Hours"	Paul Krasny	Juliet Law Packer	November 16, 1982
8	"Wilmer Bass and the Serengeti Kid"	Bruce Bilson	Story by : Bill Kelley; Teleplay by : B.W. Sandefur	November 23, 1982
9	"Escape from Kampoon"	Paul Kransky	Tim Maschler	November 30, 1982
10	"The Best of Enemies"	Nicholas Sgarro	Ira Steven Behr	December 7, 1982
11	"To Kill a Princess"	George McCowan	Story by : Bob Moloney & Scott Miller; Teleplay by : B.W. Sandefur & Arthur Weingarten	January 8, 1983
12	"Bones of Contention"	Peter H. Hunt	Story by : Bob Shayne & Tim Maschler; Teleplay by : Tim Maschler	January 15, 1983
13	"A Switch in Time"	George McCowan	Arthur Weingarten	January 22, 1983
14	"The Shadow Women of Chung Tai"	Peter H. Hunt	B.W. Sandefur	January 29, 1983
15	"The Hostage"	Paul Krasny	Steven Thornley	February 12, 1983
16	"Dead Run"	Reza Badiyi	Tim Maschler	February 19, 1983
17	"Storm Warning"	Joel Oliansky	George Schenck & Frank Cardea	May 31, 1983

== Ratings ==
Season	Episodes	Start date	End date	Nielsen rank	Nielsen rating
1982–83	17	September 24, 1982	May 31, 1983	82	N/A
