= Vels =

Vels may refer to:

- Cornelis Vels (1867–1963), South African cricketer
- Verna Vels (1933–2014), South African novelist
- Vels (river), river in Russia
- Vels University, university in Chennai, India
- The Vels, American New Wave musical group

== See also ==
- Victorian Essential Learning Standards
- Vel (disambiguation)
