= Mennen =

American deodorant brand

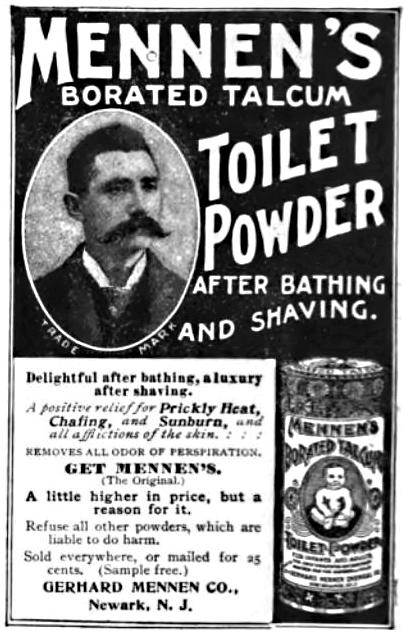
- Mennen's Borated Talcum Toilet Powder, 1898 advertisement.
- Current owner: Colgate-Palmolive
- Country: United States
- Markets: worldwide
- Previous owners: 1878 - Mennen Company; 1992 - Colgate

Mennen is a brand owned in most parts of the world by the Colgate-Palmolive Company. Its most notable product, Mennen Speed Stick, with its fougère perfume and green wide stick, was the US market leader among deodorants and antiperspirants for men for many years. It was also noted for its Lady Speed Stick deodorant and Teen Spirit deodorant, which was the leader in teenage girls' deodorants during the early 1990s.

In France, the Mennen branding is owned by L'Oréal through its Mennen-LASCAD subsidiary, for a line of men's grooming products.

== History ==
The Mennen Company was founded in 1878 by Gerhard Heinrich Mennen, an immigrant to America from Germany. His first product was a borated talcum-based powder, an innovation at the time. The company was originally located in Newark, New Jersey, US, moving to Morristown, New Jersey, in 1953, where it manufactured and sold over-the-counter pharmaceuticals and personal products such as the Skin Bracer, Speed Stick, and Baby Magic products. Lady Speed Stick was a foray into the women's market, and was a huge success due to its shape, which fit a woman's hand, and fragrances. Gerhard's grandson, G. Mennen Williams, served as Governor of Michigan 1949–1961 and as Assistant Secretary of State for African Affairs under Presidents John F. Kennedy and Lyndon B. Johnson 1961–1966.

The company was led by several generations of the Mennen family before being sold to Colgate-Palmolive Company in 1992. Today none of the Mennen family is involved in the company or its current parent. The former headquarters and manufacturing plant in Morris Township, New Jersey, was demolished in spring 2018 and replaced with housing developments and retail space. Next to it remains the Mennen Arena, a multi-purpose sports facility often used for hockey and public ice skating.

At Harpers Ferry National Historical Park, there is a giant advertisement painted on the rock face of Maryland Heights. While faded and indistinct today, it reads "Mennen's Borated Talcum Toilet Powder" and was painted between 1903 and 1906.

== Today ==
Today, the name Mennen is being phased out in some regions and products in many countries and products such as Speed Stick and Lady Speed Stick are becoming rebranded or (in each of those cases) regarded as their own separate brands. In North America, Skin Bracer and Afta are still available in 2024 and labeled as being "by Mennen", where the name is still well-known and holds positive connotations.

Neither the brand Mennen nor Skin Bracer are listed at the Colgate-Palmolive website as of January 2024.

The Baby Magic line was sold to Playtex, which has since sold the brand to Naterra; Colgate-Palmolive retained the Baby Magic branding (as Baby Magic Mennen) for the Latin American market.
