= Vel Soap =

Soap liquid detergent by Colgate-Palmolive

Vel Soap or Vel Detergent (from the slogan "Mar-VEL-ous") is a soap liquid detergent by Colgate-Palmolive. Introduced in the United States in the late 1940s, the product has been sold in places such as Argentina, Mexico, Puerto Rico, Venezuela and other Latin American countries as well as in Scandinavia. In Mexico, it was sold as Vel Rosita (Vel Pink). This was due to the liquid being pink as well as the bottles it was sold in.
