= Naterra =

American consumer packaged goods company

Naterra International, Inc.
- Industry: Consumer Packaged Goods
- Genre: Consumer Packaged Goods
- Founded: 1922
- Headquarters: Coppell, Texas
- Website: http://www.naterra.com/

Naterra International, Inc., is a privately held based consumer products sales and marketing company based in Coppell, Texas. Naterra manages several brands, including Baby Magic and Tree Hut. Mr. Jon Song is CEO. Naterra is headquartered in Coppell, Texas.

== History ==
Naterra was founded in Dallas, Texas in 1922 as the Superior Products Company. Initially, the company specialized in manufacturing private label and owned brand products, including Sue Pree and Lisa Monay, which were introduced in 1945 and were in distribution with retailers such as Wal-Mart in 1964. In 1965, the company trademarked its Lisa Mornay brand.

Superior Products Company was acquired in 1994 by the Song Family and became Naterra International, Inc. In 2002, Naterra founded the Tree Hut brand. In 2008, Naterra acquired the Baby Magic Brand from Ascendia Brands. In February 2026, Naterra founded Splash, a bodycare brand for children.

== Brands ==
Current brands include:

- Baby Magic
- Tree Hut
- Splash

Past brands:

- Skin Milk
- TimeBlock
- FootSteps
- CandleSong
- Sue Pree
- Lisa Mornay
- Aqua Spa
- All that Glitters
