= Skin Bracer =

Aftershave lotion manufactured by Colgate-Palmolive

Skin Bracer is a liquid aftershave launched by Mennen in 1931, and manufactured by Colgate-Palmolive following its purchase of Mennen in 1992. Two additional variants of Skin Bracer, Cooling Blue and Cool Spice were once sold but are now discontinued.

Neither the brand Mennen nor Skin Bracer are listed at the Colgate-Palmolive website as of January 2024; However, the product is still available - labeled as produced by Mennen - online (at such established vendors as Amazon and Walmart) as of that date.
