= Velu, Iran =

Velu or Velow (Persian: ولو) in Iran may refer to:

- Velu, Mazandaran, a village in Iran
- Velu, North Khorasan, a village in Iran
