= Teen Spirit (deodorant) =

Deodorant sold by Colgate-Palmolive

- An earlier Teen Spirit Stick deodorant, with an "Orchard Blossom" scent
- Product type: Deodorant/antiperspirant
- Current owner: Colgate-Palmolive
- Country: United States
- Introduced: 1991; 35 years ago
- Markets: Worldwide
- Previous owners: The Mennen Company (1991–1992)

Teen Spirit is a deodorant, originally sold by Mennen, then by Colgate-Palmolive after Colgate-Palmolive acquired Mennen in 1992.

== History ==
Teen Spirit was first released by Mennen early in 1991. It was the first deodorant marketed specifically to teens. Sales were boosted by the grunge band Nirvana's 1991 song "Smells Like Teen Spirit", named after a piece of graffiti by singer Kathleen Hanna in reference to the deodorant brand.

By April 1993, Teen Spirit was a "successful niche brand" with a 1.5% share of the US deodorant and antiperspirant market. In August 1993, the company introduced a Teen Spirit hair-care line with a $6 million advertising campaign targeting teenagers. However, as of 1995, the brand's chief demographic was younger than the company had intended, appealing mainly to 9–15 year old girls. A contemporary poll showed that older teens were put off by brands with the word "teen" in the name, preferring to be marketed to as "young men/women" or "young adults".

The Teen Spirit name began to lose its share of the market, so the company reduced the range, just keeping the deodorants. In 2014, Teen Spirit Stick was offered in two fragrances: Pink Crush and Sweet Strawberry, which were available in either the 1.4 or 2.3 ounce (40 or 69 gram) sizes. By 2025 the Teen Spirit franchise was simply the "Teen-Spirit Stick".

== Scents ==
- Pink Crush
- Sweet Strawberry

=== Discontinued scents ===
- Berry Blossom
- Pop Star
- Baby Powder Soft
- Romantic Rose
- California Breeze
- Ocean Surf
- Caribbean Cool
- Orchard Blossom
- Cool Coconut
