= Vel River =

Vel River (Russian: Вель) is the name of several rivers:

- Vel or Velyu, a tributary of the Pechora in Komi Republic, Russia
- Vel (Vaga), a tributary of the Vaga in Arkhangelsk Oblast, Russia
- Vel River (Bhima) (Welu River), a tributary of the Bhima River in Pune District, Maharashtra, India
