= Murugan (surname) =

Murugan is a given name and surname, commonly used among Tamil and Malayalam speaking people. Notable people with the surname include:

- AR Murugadoss, Indian filmmaker
- Chidambaram Murugan (born 1973), Indian botanist whose standard author abbreviation is Murugan
- Durai Murugan (born 1938), Indian politician
- Murugan Chillayah (born 1978), Guru yogi and Indian traditional arts teacher
- Perumal Murugan (born 1966), Indian novelist
- Raju Murugan, Indian filmmaker
- Sangili Murugan (born 1945), Indian film actor
- Saravanan Murugan (born 1968), Malaysian politician
