= Colgate-Palmolive =

American multinational consumer products company

Colgate-Palmolive Company
- Logo used since 2025

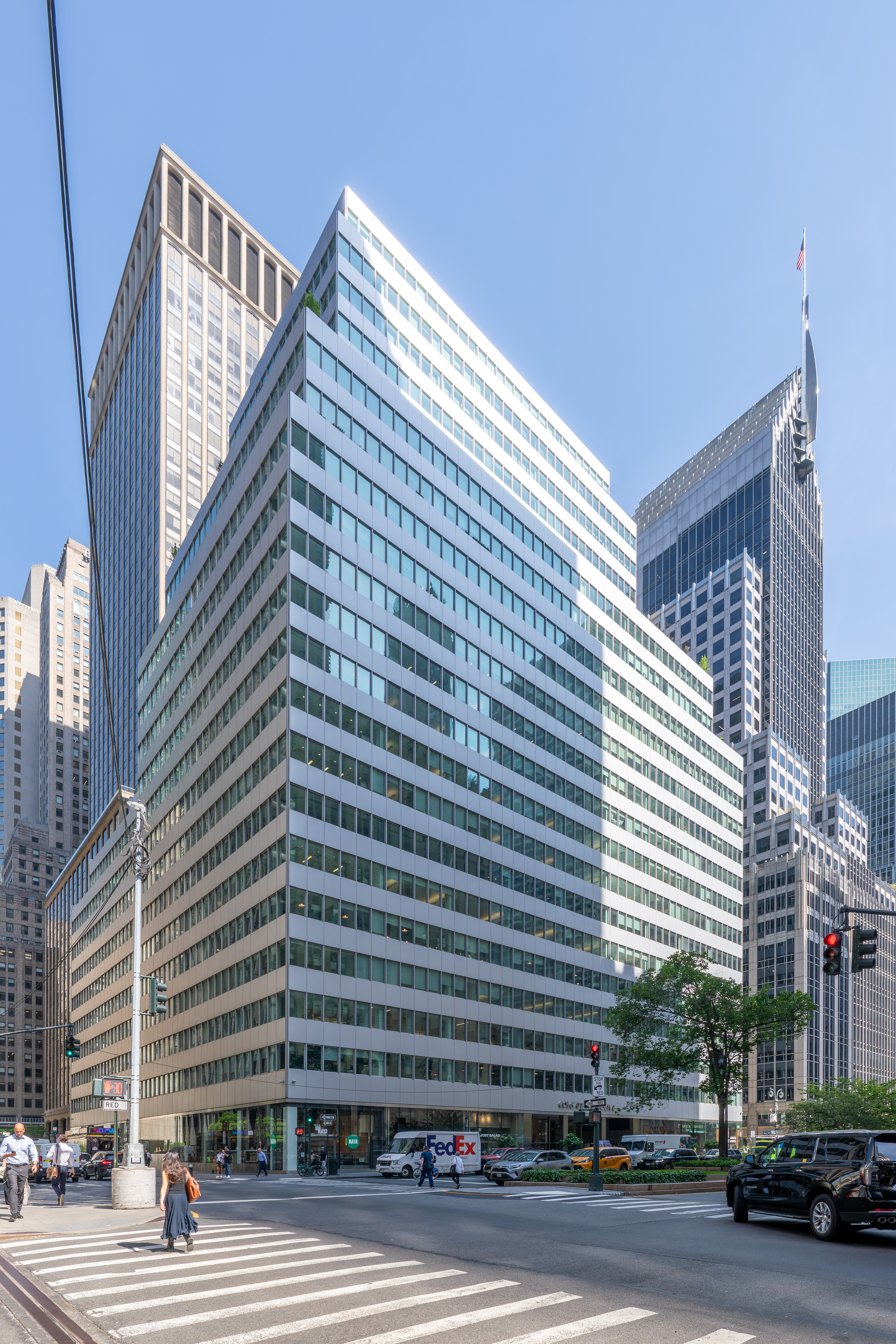
- Headquarters in Midtown Manhattan, New York City
- Trade name: Colgate-Palmolive
- Formerly: Colgate-Palmolive-Peet Company (1928–1953)
- Type: Public
- Traded as: NYSE: CL; S&P 500 component
- Industry: Consumer goods
- Predecessors: Colgate; Palmolive; (pre-1953 merger)
- Founded: 1806; 220 years ago
- Founders: William Colgate (Colgate); Burdett J. Johnson (Palmolive); William J. Peet and Robert Peet (Peet Brothers)
- Headquarters: New York City, U.S.
- Area served: Worldwide
- Key people: Noel Wallace (Chairman, President & CEO); Stanley J. Sutula III (CFO)
- Products: Cleaning agents; Personal care products; Pet food
- Revenue: ▲US$20.4 billion (2025)
- Net income: ▼US$2.13 billion (2025)
- Number of employees: c. 34,000 (2024)
- Website: colgatepalmolive.com

The Colgate-Palmolive Company, commonly known as Colgate-Palmolive, is an American multinational consumer products company headquartered on Park Avenue in Midtown Manhattan, New York City. The company specializes in the production, distribution, and provision of household, health care, personal care, and veterinary products.

== History and founding ==
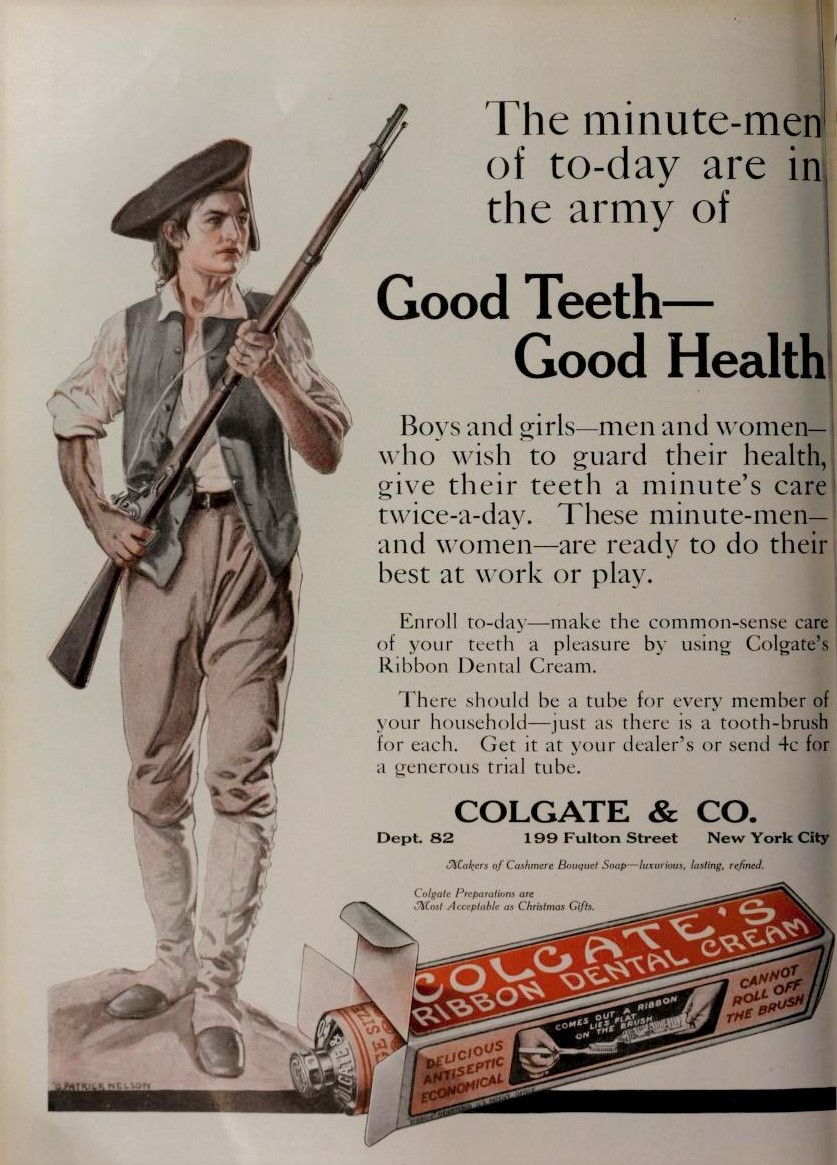
1913 magazine ad of Colgate toothpaste

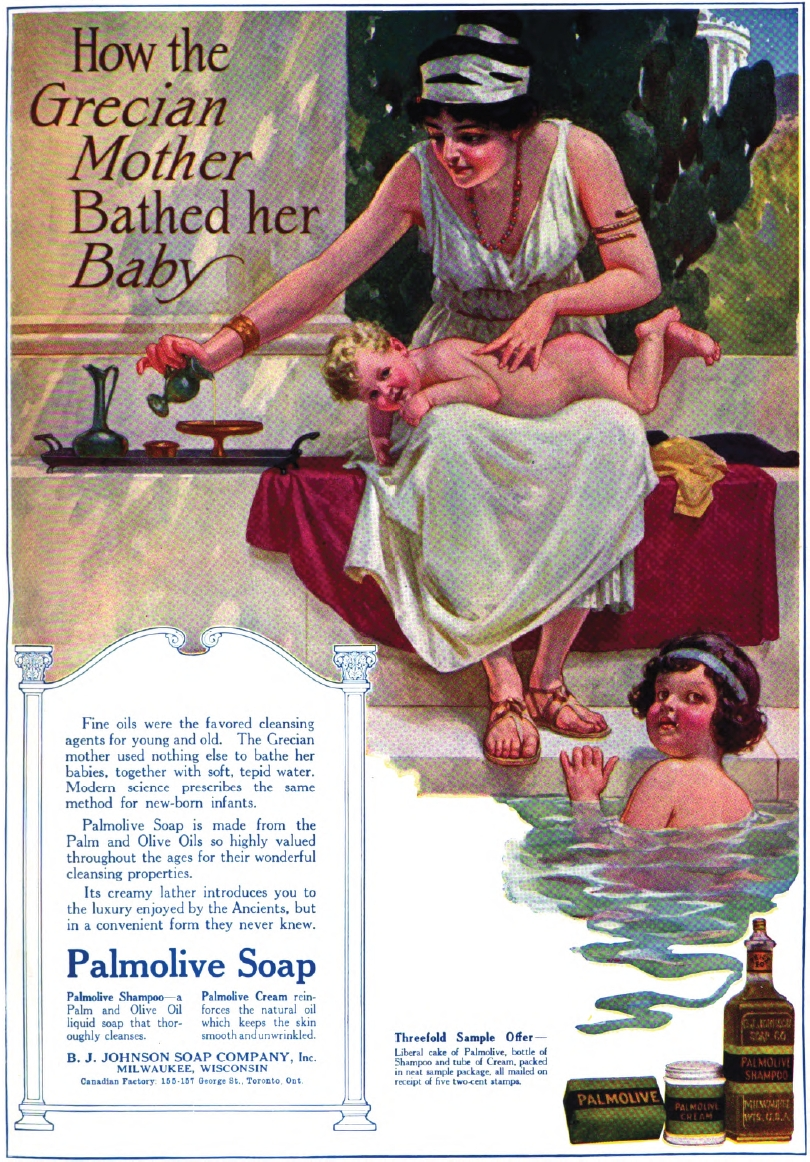
1915 magazine ad of Palmolive soap

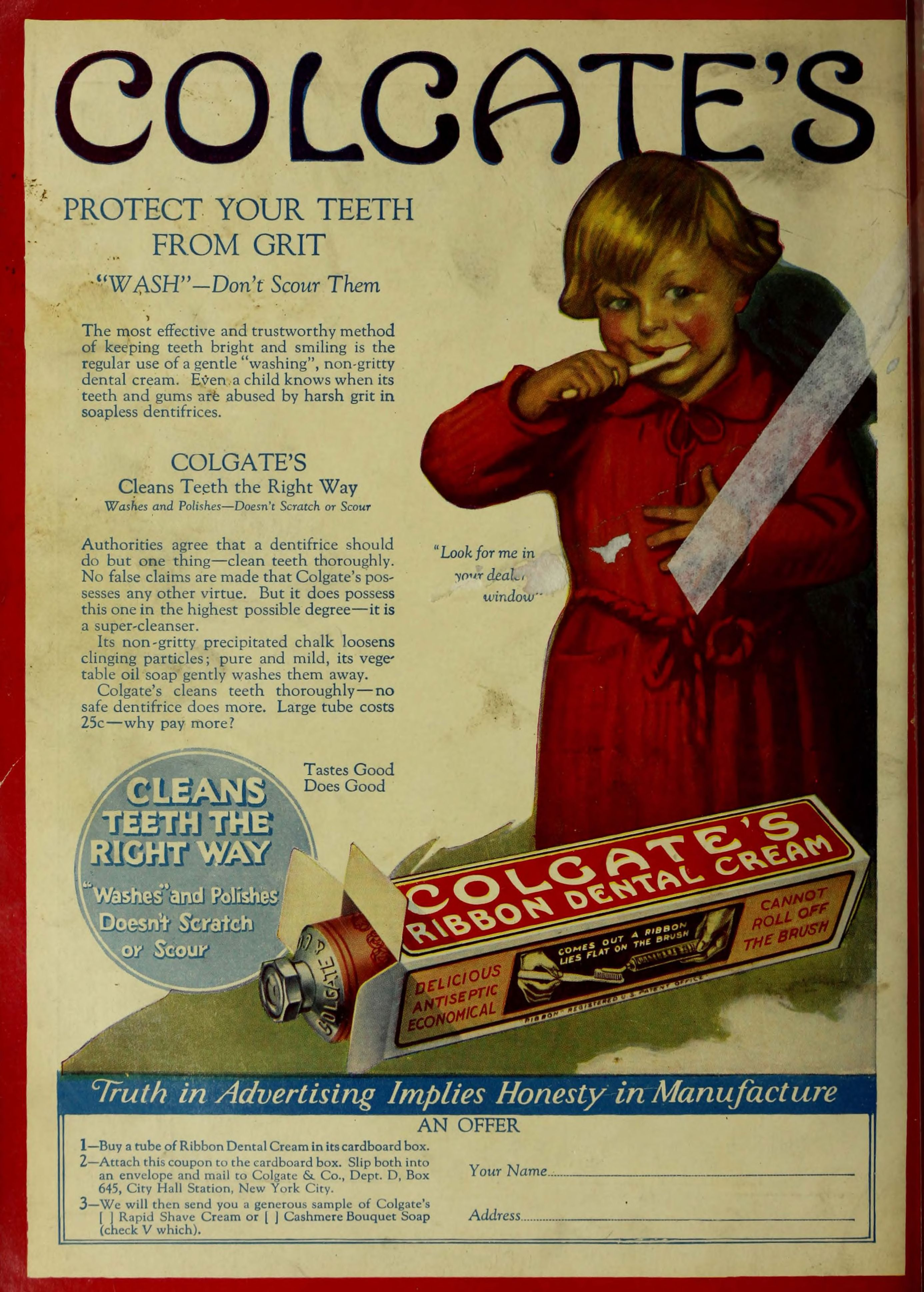
1923 Red Book magazine ad for Colgate’s Ribbon Dental Cream

Logo used from 1983 to 2025

William Colgate, an English immigrant to the United States and devout Baptist, established a starch, soap, and candle factory on Dutch Street in New York City under the name William Colgate & Company in 1806.

In 1833, he suffered a severe heart attack, stopping his business's sales; after a convalescence he continued with his business. In the 1840s, the company began selling individual cakes of soap in uniform weights. In 1857, Colgate died and the company was reorganized as Colgate & Company under the management of his similarly devout Baptist son Samuel Colgate, who did not want to continue the business but thought it would be the right thing to do. In 1872, he introduced Cashmere Bouquet, a perfumed soap.

In 1873, the company introduced its first Colgate toothpaste, an aromatic toothpaste sold in jars. In 1896, the company sold the first toothpaste in a tube, named Colgate Ribbon Dental Cream (invented by dentist Washington Sheffield). Also in 1896, Colgate hired Martin Ittner and under his direction founded one of the first applied research labs. By 1908, it initiated mass sales of toothpaste in tubes. Another of William Colgate's sons, James Boorman Colgate, was a primary trustee of Colgate University (formerly Madison University).

In Milwaukee, Wisconsin, the B. J. Johnson Company was making a soap from palm oil and olive oil, the formula of which had been developed by Burdett J. Johnson in 1898. The soap was so popular that the company was re-named Palmolive in 1917. Around the start of the 20th century, Palmolive was the world's best-selling soap.

In June 1928, rumors started that "officials of the Palmolive-Peet Co. are negotiating to purchase the Colgate Co.", privately held by the Colgate family. Peet Brothers Soap Company of Kansas City had merged with Palmolive two years before the merger with Colgate. The merger combined the three oldest and largest soap and perfumery companies in the US and became effective on July 1, 1928. The combined company was named the "Colgate Palmolive Peet Company". The combined pre-merger sales in 1927 of the three companies exceeded $100,000,000 (equivalent to $1.875000000×10^{9} in 2025). The newly combined company had seven US manufacturing facilities as well as factories in 14 foreign countries. In 1953, the companies became a joint venture, known as the Colgate-Palmolive Company.

== Competition with P&G ==
Colgate-Palmolive has long been in competition with Procter & Gamble (P&G), the world's largest soap and detergent maker and the maker of Crest toothpaste. P&G introduced its Tide laundry detergent shortly after World War II, and thousands of consumers turned from Colgate's soaps to the new product. Colgate lost its number-one place in the toothpaste market when P&G added fluoride to its toothpastes Crest and Gleem (The Gleem brand was discontinued by P&G in 2014). Colgate has since re-claimed the #1 sales position. In the beginning of the TV era, Colgate-Palmolive wished to compete with P&G as a sponsor of soap operas and sponsored only two soap operas, The Doctors on NBC & ABC's One Life To Live from the shows debut in July 1968 until ABC bought One Life To Live from its creator Agnes Nixon in December 1974. They tried to keep the sponsorship of One Life To Live and gain sponsorship of Nixon's newest soap opera All My Children which ABC begin airing on January 5 of 1970 but ABC would not allow it. However, The Doctors was sponsored by Colgate-Palmolive for its entire run from April 1963 until its cancellation in December 1982.

After The Doctors cancellation, Colgate-Palmolive never sponsored another show. P&G continued sponsoring several soap operas on all three networks until its last show As the World Turns was canceled in September 2010.

George Henry Lesch, president, CEO, and chairman of the board of Colgate-Palmolive in the 1960s and 1970s, transformed the firm into a modern company with major restructuring.

== Recent years ==
In August 2026, Colgate-Palmolive India partnerned with direct-to-consumer (D2C) brand Bombay Shaving Company to manage the digital advertising and e-commerce operations for its Palmolive personal care portfolio.

In 2005, Colgate sold the under-performing brands Fab, Dynamo, Arctic Power, ABC, Cold Power and Fresh Start, as well as the license of the Ajax brand for laundry detergents in the US, Canada and Puerto Rico, to Phoenix Brands, LLC as part of its plan to focus on its higher margin oral, personal, and pet care products.

In 2006, Colgate-Palmolive announced the intended acquisition of Tom's of Maine, a leading maker of natural toothpaste, for US$100 million. Tom's of Maine was founded by Tom Chappell in 1970.

In 2020, Colgate-Palmolive acquired Hello Products LLC, one of the fastest-growing premium oral care brands in the United States, for an undisclosed amount.

Today, Colgate has numerous subsidiary organizations spanning 200 countries, but it is publicly listed in three: the United States, India, and Pakistan.

On October 25, 2012, the company announced it would cut 2,310 workers, or 6% of its workforce, by the end of 2016 in a push to make the consumer products company more efficient. The company ranked 184th on the 2018 Fortune 500 list of the largest United States corporations by revenue. In 2021, the company ranked 15th on the list of Most Trusted Brands by Morning Consult.

=== Educational and community involvement ===
In 1890, Madison University in New York State was renamed Colgate University in honor of the Colgate family following decades of financial support and involvement.

The Colgate-Palmolive Company has sponsored a non-profit track meet open to women of all ages called the Colgate Women's Games. The Colgate Women's Games is the nation's largest amateur track series open to all girls from elementary school through college. Held at Brooklyn's Pratt Institute, competitors participate in preliminary meets and semi-finals over five weekends throughout January. Finalists compete for trophies and educational grants-in-aid from Colgate-Palmolive Company at New York City's Madison Square Garden in February. For more than 20 years, the company supports the Starlight Children Foundation which is a non profit organization dedicated to help seriously ill children and their families. The mission is to help children to cope with pain, fear and isolation through entertainment, family activities and education.

The Colgate website has resources for children including educational tooth brushing songs and animated videos featuring its former animated mascot Dr. Rabbit.

=== Ethics ===
In 2011, Colgate-Palmolive was one of the first companies recognized by PETA (People for the Ethical Treatment of Animals) under the new "working for regulatory change" category for companies that test on animals only when mandated by government regulations and are actively seeking alternatives to animal testing. This relates to the corporation's decision to continue to participate in the profitable Chinese market, where some animal testing is still a regulatory requirement. Other companies have chosen to decline entry to this market.

In 2006, Colgate-Palmolive acquired an 84% stake in Tom's of Maine. In 2011, the company chose to retain the use of the antibacterial agent triclosan in its market-leading Total toothpaste range, despite withdrawing it from several other product ranges, following concerns about triclosan's impact on health and the environment.

As of January 2024, Ethical Consumer website states that "Our research highlights several ethical issues with Colgate-Palmolive, including its approach to palm oil, supply chain management, climate change, excessive pay, tax, human rights, and animal testing. It scored our worst rating across all of these categories."

=== Environmental record ===
Colgate-Palmolive received the 2012 Safe-in-Sound Excellence in Hearing Loss Prevention Award.

As a successor to the Mennen Company, Colgate-Palmolive was reported in 2017 as one of about 300 companies held potentially responsible for hazardous waste at the Chemsol federal Superfund site in Piscataway, New Jersey. Their involvement in this site may have contributed to the contamination of an estimated 18,500 cubic yards (14,100 m^{3}) of soil with volatile organic compounds (VOCs), PCBs, and lead off-site. A proposed $23 million agreement with the government and state of New Jersey would require Colgate-Palmolive and the other involved companies to pay for the cleanup of this hazardous waste that is contaminating the soil as well as the groundwater.

In 2019, BreakFreeFromPlastic cited Colgate-Palmolive as one of the world's top ten plastic polluters. Previously, Colgate-Palmolive had committed to 100% recyclability of plastics in packaging across all its product categories by 2025 but made no commitment to reducing the use of virgin plastic in packaging.

A 2021 report by Global Witness, updated in 2022, stated that Colgate-Palmolive had used palm oil suppliers connected to bribery, brutalisation of villagers and child labour in Papua New Guinea.

In 2021, the Rainforest Action Network (RAN) gave Colgate-Palmolive a score of "F" on their "scorecard" keeping track of deforestation and human rights abuses. In August 2021, Colgate-Palmolive publicly disclosed the "forest impact of its palm oil supply chain in the Indonesian province of North Sumatra", showing the impact on the rainforests and the indigenous people who live there. In November 2023, Colgate-Palmolive received a "D-" on their RAN scorecard.

In relation to climate change, in June 2023, Planet Tracker stated that Colgate-Palmolive "is on a path to missing its approved Science-based Targets emissions by a factor of 7 when optional indirect use emissions are excluded", it "provides 'no clear strategy' to mitigate its main source of emissions, namely, upstream Scope 3 activities" and its "climate engagement with its value chain has not resulted in positive results over the last half-decade, with the GhG emissions from key 'targeted' areas experiencing substantial growth." Sustainability Beat stated in August 2023 that this puts its profits in jeopardy and risks greenwashing.

In 2024, the website Ethical Consumer gave Colgate-Palmolive the worst possible rating for climate change, plastic use, and palm oil/deforestation. It received their best rating for avoiding toxic chemicals in its products.

=== Corporate governance ===
As of August 2023, members of the board of directors of Colgate-Palmolive are the following:

- Noel Wallace
- John P. Bilbrey
- Lisa M. Edwards
- C. Martin Harris
- Martina Hund-Mejean
- Kimberly A. Nelson
- Lorrie M. Norrington
- Steve Cahillane
- John T. Cahill
- Stephen Sadove

=== Employment diversity ===
Colgate-Palmolive was named one of the "100 Best Companies for Working Mothers" by Working Mother magazine. The 2012 Human Rights Campaign "report card" on American businesses gave Colgate an A for its support of diversity in the workplace.

However, Ethical Consumer states that the company "published no standards for working hours and wages and no information about the outcomes of supply chain audits. There was no clear mechanism workers could use to make anonymous complaints and raise issues", and scores badly in their human rights category.

=== Response to Russian invasion of Ukraine ===
Following Russia's invasion of Ukraine in 2022, Colgate-Palmolive announced a suspension of imports and sales in Russia, limiting operations to essential health and hygiene products. The company also halted all capital investments, media, advertising, and promotional activities within the country. As of December 2024, Colgate-Palmolive's current operational status in Russia remains unspecified.

== Brands ==
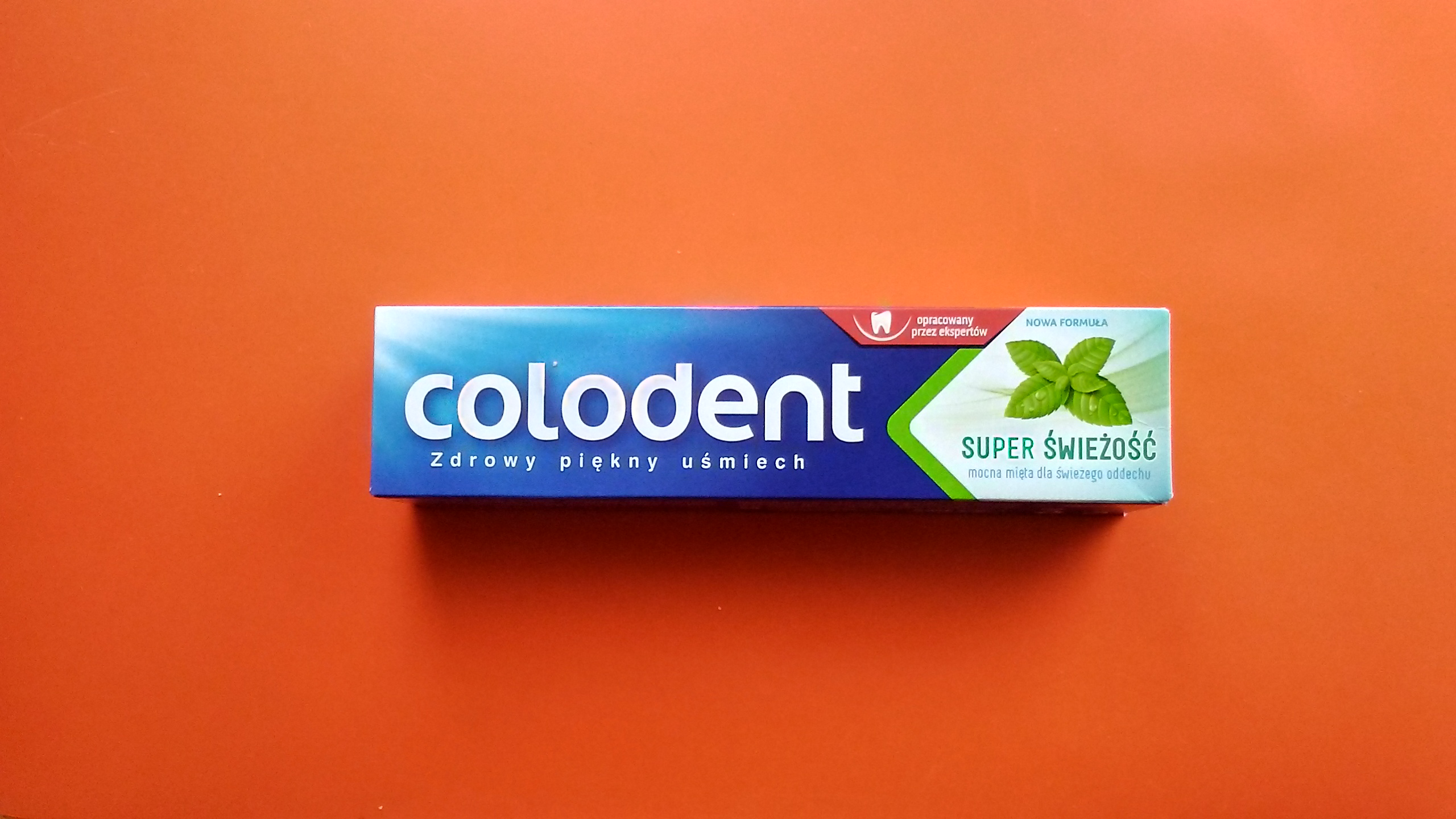
Colodent – Colgate-Palmolive toothpaste brand available in Poland

Colgate-Palmolive now markets a broadly diversified mix of products in the United States and other countries. Major product areas include household and personal care products, food products, health care and industrial supplies, and sports and leisure time equipment.

- Afta Lotion
- Anthony longlife soap
- Anbesol
- Ajax
- Axion
- Caprice (shampoo; Mexico)
- Cibaca (India)
- Cold Power
- Colgate
- Colodent (Poland)
- Crystal White Octagon
- Cuddly (Australia)
- Darlie (toothpaste; Southeast Asia)
- Dermassage
- Dentagard (toothpaste; Germany)
- Duraphat (fluoride varnish)
- Dynamo (detergent)
- Elmex (toothpaste)
- EltaMD (skincare)
- Fab (detergent)
- Fabuloso (all purpose cleaner)
- Filorga (cosmetics; France)
- Fluffy (Australia)
- Fresh Start
- Freska-Ra (Mexico)
- Gard (shampoo)
- Hacı Şakir (Turkey)
- Hello Products
- Hill's Pet Nutrition (pet food)
- Hurricane (detergent; Australia)
- Irish Spring
- Kolynos
- La Croix (bleach; France)
- Mennen
- Meridol (toothpaste)
- Murphy Oil Soap
- Nifti (detergent; Australia)
- Palmolive
- PCA Skin
- Pousse Mousse (acquired from S. C. Johnson & Son)
- Profidén (toothpaste; Spain)
- Protex
- Sanex
- Science Diet
- Skin Bracer
- Softsoap
- Soft As Soap (soap; Australia)
- Softlan (softener; Southeast Asia)
- Soupline (France, Belgium, Greece)
- Speed Stick
- Spree (detergent; Australia)
- Suavitel (Mexico)
- Tahiti (soap; France, Belgium, Switzerland)
- Teen Spirit
- Tender Care
- Tom's of Maine
- Ultra Brite

== Discontinued products and former brands ==
- Ajax Laundry Detergent (Ajax Cleanser still made by Colgate-Palmolive)
- Ad (detergent)
- Bambeanos
- Brisk (fluoride toothpaste)
- Burst (detergent)
- Cue (fluoride toothpaste)
- Cashmere Bouquet (soap)
- Cherish (cinnamon flavored toothpaste)

Cherish toothpaste logo

- Cold Power (detergent)* (known in Canada as Arctic Power, Australian and New Zealand rights sold to Henkel in May 2015)
- Coleo (soap)
- Colgate Tooth Powder** and Colgate Chlorophyll Tooth Powder
- Colgate Toothpaste with Chlorophyll**
- Dynamo laundry detergent (liquid detergent-no longer made by CP in the U.S.)
- Fab Detergent (no longer made by CP in the U.S.)
- Fab One Shot (detergent)
- Florient (room deodorizer)
- Halo Shampoo
- Kolynos (toothpaste)**
- Lustre-Creme Shampoo
- Octagon (soap)
- Palmolive Rapid Shave
- Colgate's Peter Pan Beauty Bar with Chlorophyll
- Soaky (bubble bath for kids)
- Super Suds (detergent)
- Swerl (liquid cleanser)
- Vel (dishwashing detergent)

Notes:

* While detergent brands continue to be manufactured and sold by Colgate in some countries, in the United States they have been sold to another company, Phoenix Brands in 2005. Phoenix Brands filed for bankruptcy in May 2016 and the US rights have been assumed by Fab & Kind Company.

In May 2015, Colgate-Palmolive sold its Australian laundry detergents and pre-wash brands to Henkel for US$245 million (€220 million). Colgate-Palmolive has divested its laundry detergents business in Colombia, which was in turn acquired by Unilever and some Asian countries, which was acquired by Procter & Gamble.

** Still being made by Colgate-Palmolive internationally, but no longer available in the U.S.

== Facilities ==
In the U.S., the company operates approximately 60 properties, of which 14 are owned. Major U.S. manufacturing and warehousing facilities used by the oral, personal and home care segment of Colgate-Palmolive were located in Morristown, New Jersey (previously the headquarters of the Mennen company prior to its 1992 buyout, and still HQ of the Mennen division) until 2014, when the plant shut down and moved operations to Hodges, South Carolina; Morristown, Tennessee; and Cambridge, Ohio. The pet nutrition segment has major facilities in Bowling Green, Kentucky; Emporia, Kansas; Topeka, Kansas; and Richmond, Indiana. The primary research center for oral, personal and home care products is located in Piscataway, New Jersey and the primary research center for pet nutrition products is located in Topeka, Kansas.

Overseas, the company operates approximately 280 properties of which 80 are owned in over 70 countries. Major overseas facilities used by the oral, personal and home care segment are located in Australia, Brazil, China, Colombia, France, Guatemala, India, Italy, Malaysia, Mexico, Pakistan, Poland, South Africa, Thailand, Venezuela, Vietnam and elsewhere throughout the world.

Colgate-Palmolive has closed or is in the process of phasing out production at certain facilities under a restructuring program initiated in 2004 and has built new state-of-the-art plants to produce toothpaste in the U.S., Mexico and Poland.

Colgate-Palmolive's chief manufacturing plant is located in Burlington Township, New Jersey, producing all of the fragrance and flavor oils for the company's facilities around the world.

== Advertising ==
The iconic hand on the Palmolive dishwashing soap label belongs to hand model Elizabeth Barbour. The image is an illustration of a photograph taken in 1985 when the Colgate-Palmolive Company updated the image, hiring Barbour, then with the Ford Agency in New York City.
