= Kingfish: A Story of Huey P. Long =

1995 biographical television film

- VHS cover
- Written by: Paul Monash
- Directed by: Thomas Schlamme
- Starring: John Goodman; Matt Craven; Anne Heche
- Music by: Patrick Williams
- Country of origin: United States
- Original language: English

Production
- Producers: Bob Christiansen; Rick Rosenberg; John Goodman
- Cinematography: Alexander Gruszynski
- Editor: Paul Dixon
- Running time: 100 minutes

Original release
- Network: TNT
- Release: March 19, 1995

Kingfish: A Story of Huey P. Long is a 1995 television drama starring John Goodman and directed by Thomas Schlamme. The film originally aired on TNT and was nominated for two Emmy awards.

== Plot ==
This is a biographical drama about Louisiana politician Huey Long, whose nickname was The Kingfish. He served as the 40th Governor of Louisiana from 1928 to 1932 and as a member of the United States Senate from 1932 until his assassination in 1935. As the political leader of Louisiana, he commanded wide networks of supporters and was willing to take forceful action. He established the long-term political prominence of the Long family.

== Cast ==
- John Goodman as Huey Long
- Matt Craven as Seymour Weiss
- Anne Heche as Aileen Dumont
- Ann Dowd as Rose Long
- Bob Gunton as Franklin D. Roosevelt
- Bill Cobbs as Pullman Porter
- Hoyt Axton as Huey P. Long Sr.
- Kirk Baltz as Frank Costello
- Richard Bradford as Judge Benjamin Pavy
- Joe Chrest as Carl Weiss
- Jimmie Ray Weeks as Allen Henderson
