= Sodium lauroyl sarcosinate =

Surfactant

Names
- IUPAC name Sodium N-(Dodecanoyl)-N-methylglycinate
- Systematic IUPAC name Sodium (N-methyldodecanamido)acetate

Identifiers
CAS Number	137-16-6
3D model (JSmol)	Interactive image
ChEMBL	ChEMBL1903482
ChemSpider	8392
ECHA InfoCard	100.004.801
EC Number	205-281-5
PubChem CID	23668817
UNII	632GS99618
CompTox Dashboard (EPA)	DTXSID0027066
- InChI: Key: KSAVQLQVUXSOCR-UHFFFAOYSA-M; InChI=1S/C15H29NO3.Na/c1-3-4-5-6-7-8-9-10-11-12-14(17)16(2)13-15(18)19;/h3-13H2,1-2H3,(H,18,19);/q;+1/p-1
- SMILES: CCCCCCCCCCCC(=O)N(C)CC(=O)[O-].[Na+]

Properties
Chemical formula	C_{15}H_{28}NNaO_{3}
Molar mass	293.383 g·mol^{−1}
Melting point	140 °C (284 °F; 413 K)
- Except where otherwise noted, data are given for materials in their standard state (at 25 °C [77 °F], 100 kPa). verify (what is ?) Infobox references

Sodium lauroyl sarcosinate (INCI), also known as sarcosyl, is an anionic surfactant derived from sarcosine used as a foaming and cleansing agent in shampoo, shaving foam, toothpaste, and foam wash products.

This surfactant is amphiphilic due to the hydrophobic 12-carbon chain (lauroyl) and the hydrophilic carboxylate. Since the nitrogen atom is in an amide linkage, the nitrogen is not pH active and is neutrally charged in all aqueous solutions regardless of pH. The carboxylate has a pKa of about 3.6 and is therefore negatively charged in solutions of pH greater than about 5.5.

pH-sensitive vesicles can be prepared using this surfactant with another cationic or water-insoluble amphiphiles such as 1-decanol.

Addition of a mixture of equal parts of sodium lauroyl sarcosinate and the non-ionic surfactant sorbitan monolaurate (S20) to a buffered water:ethanol solution led to the formation of micelle-like aggregates, even though neither surfactant formed micelles when present alone. Such aggregates can help carry other small molecules, such as drugs, through the skin.

== In culture ==
Sodium lauroyl sarcosinate was sold as a special ingredient called "Gardol" in Colgate "Dental Cream", as toothpaste was then called, during the 1950s through the mid-1960s in the US and the mid-1970s in France. Its current use as a preventive dentifrice is in Arm & Hammer Baking Soda Toothpaste, a Church & Dwight product, where it is used as a surfactant.
