= Colgate (toothpaste) =

American dental hygiene brand

- Logo used since 2018
- Product type: Oral hygiene
- Current owner: Colgate-Palmolive
- Country: United States
- Introduced: 1873; 153 years ago
- Markets: Worldwide
- Website: colgate.com

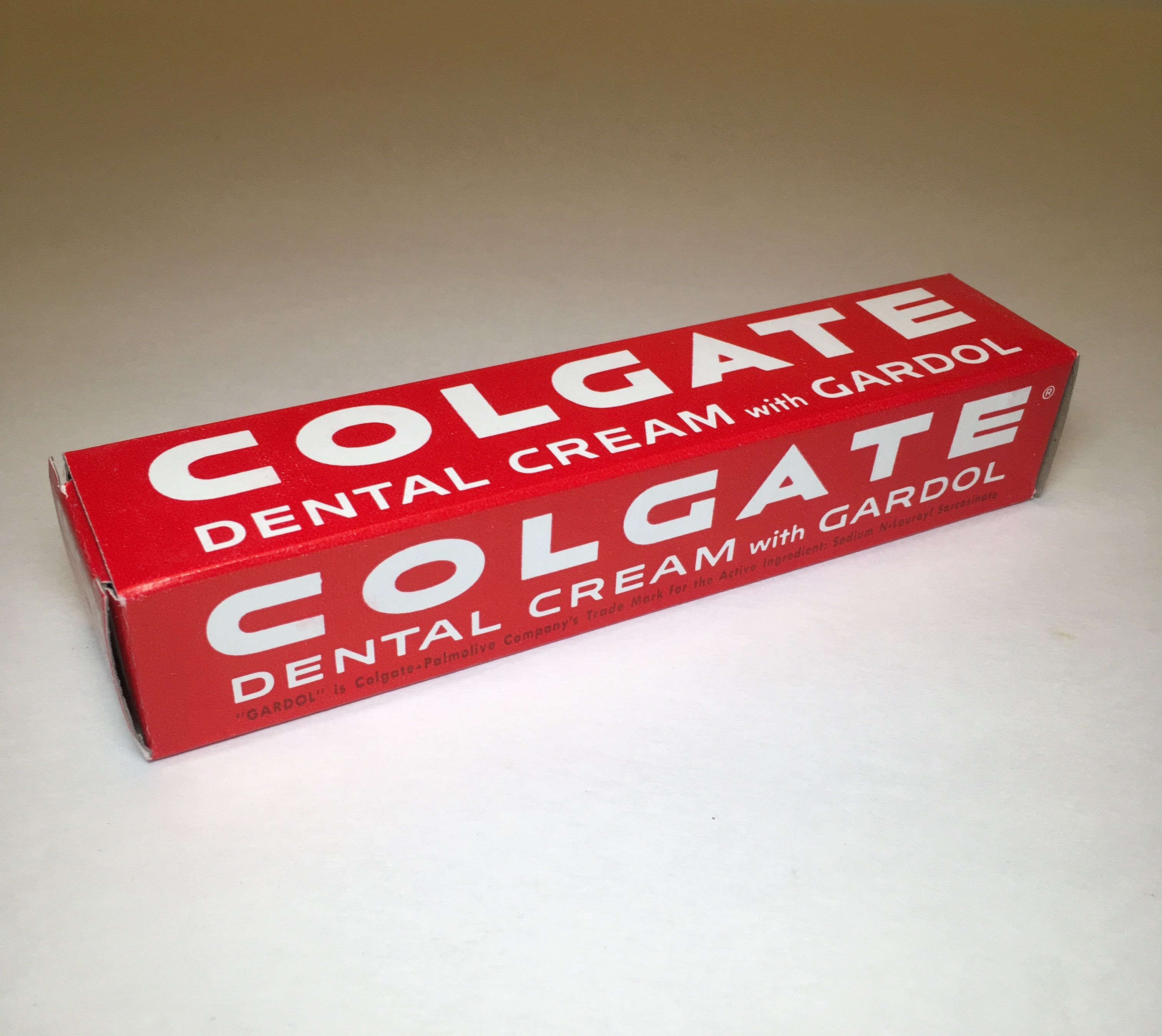
Colgate Dental Cream (toothpaste) with Gardol c. 1950s

Colgate is an American multinational brand principally used for oral hygiene products such as toothpastes, toothbrushes, mouthwashes and dental floss. Manufactured by Colgate-Palmolive, Colgate's oral hygiene products were first sold by the company in 1873, sixteen years after the death of the founder, William Colgate. The company originally sold soap.

== History ==
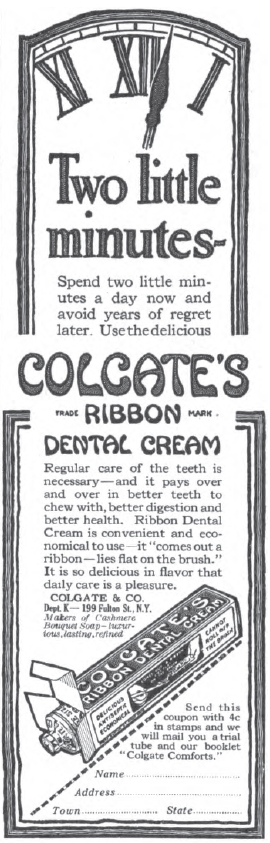
Colgate advertised in The American Magazine in 1915.

Colgate toothpaste was sold in glass jars since 1873. Tubes, as pioneered by Kalodont, Johnson & Johnson (Zonweiss) and Sheffield, were introduced in 1896.

Colgate became popular in the 1950s, with the slogan "It Cleans Your Breath While It Cleans Your Teeth", written by copywriter Alicia Tobin.

In 2018, Colgate licensed Kolibree technology from Paris-based Baracoda Daily Healthtech, launching the Colgate Smart Electric toothbrush. They offer connected toothbrushes for children and adults under the Hum brand umbrella.

Colgate previously used triclosan as the active anti-bacterial agent in Colgate Total toothpaste, since its introduction in 1997. No other toothpaste brand in the USA used triclosan when Colgate Total was introduced; Colgate pioneered the use of triclosan in toothpaste. The FDA ruled on September 6, 2016, that triclosan is not generally recognized as safe and effective (GRAS/GRAE). Due to health and environmental concerns, triclosan was phased out, and by 2019 it is no longer used.

In January 2020, Colgate registered the label for toothpaste containing hemp oil with the U.S. government.

In February 2020, Colgate's parent company announced an agreement to purchase Hello Products, a New Jersey company that had earlier in the month introduced toothpaste, mouthwashes, and lip balms containing cannabidiol (CBD).

Colgate Tooth Powder is still being manufactured and marketed.

== Reception ==
According to a 2015 report by market research company Kantar Worldpanel, Colgate was the only brand in the world purchased by more than half of all households. Colgate had a global market penetration of 67.7% and a global market share of 45%. It maintained the highest growth rate of all brands in the survey, with 40 million new households purchasing Colgate-branded products in 2014.

== See also ==
- List of toothpaste brands
- Index of oral health and dental articles
