= Nurdle (toothpaste) =

Wavy toothpaste blob

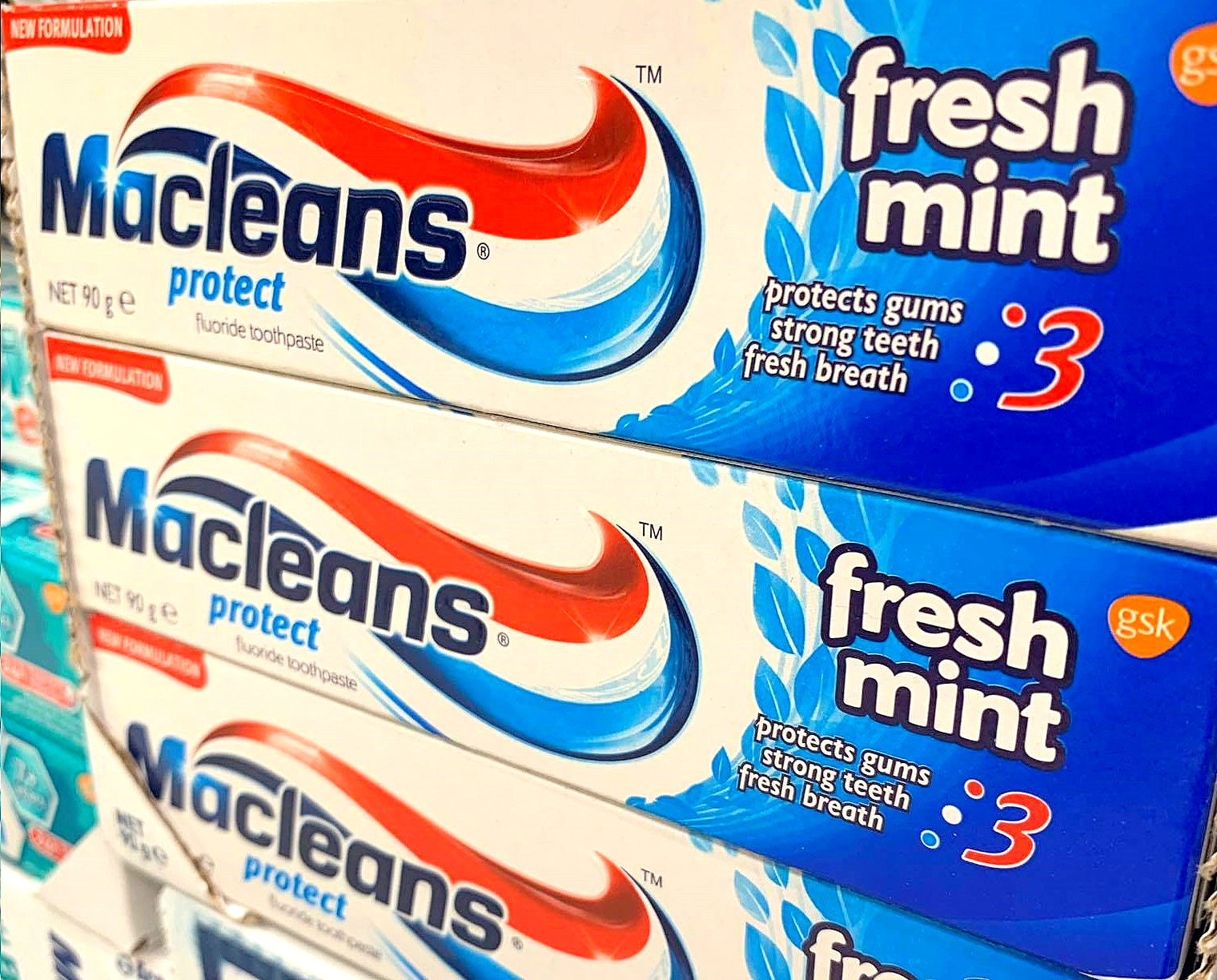
Toothpaste packaging with the nurdle shape as part of the design

A nurdle is the wave shaped blob often seen in toothpaste advertisements or on the packaging of toothpaste tubes.

== History ==
The use of the nurdle wasn't widespread until the 1970s, when toothpaste went from white paste to colored gels.

The term "nurdle" is believed to originate from the American Dental Association in the 1990s to encourage the public to use proper brushing technique.

== Conflicts ==
In July 2010, the companies Colgate-Palmolive and GlaxoSmithKline engaged in a lawsuit over the nurdle. Colgate stated in the 76 page complaint that the nurdle on their toothpaste which had the text "Triple Action", was infringed on by the nurdle by Glaxo, specifically Aquafresh, which said "Triple Protection". Colgate stated they were doing this "to hinder fair competition."
