= Washington Sheffield =

American dental surgeon and inventor

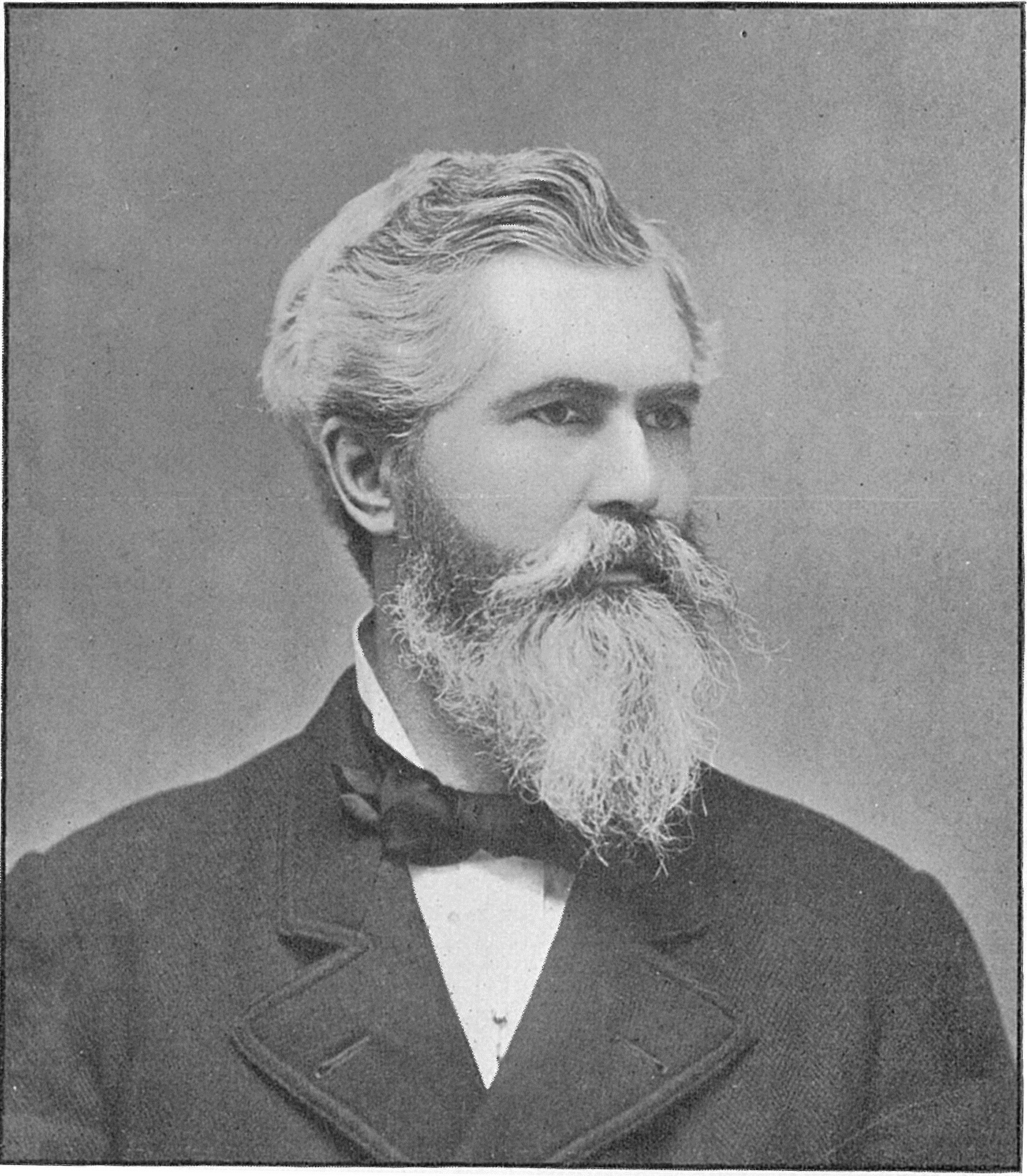
- Born: Washington Wentworth Sheffield; April 23, 1827; North Stonington, Connecticut
- Died: November 4, 1897 (aged 70)
- Other names: W.W. Sheffield
- Occupation: Dental Surgeon
- Known for: Inventor of Toothpaste

Washington Wentworth Sheffield (April 23, 1827 – November 4, 1897) was an American dental surgeon best known for inventing modern toothpaste in the 1870s. With the help of his son Lucius T. Sheffield, he was also the first to sell the paste in collapsible tubes. He was considered one of the most skilled dentists in New England and the United States, making important contributions to the fields of dentistry and dental surgery.

Later in life, he spent most of his time as treasurer and manager of his companies, the Sheffield Dentifrice Company (which later became Sheffield Pharmaceuticals) and the International Tooth Crown Company, in New London, Connecticut.

As of 2023, his original toothpaste recipe continues to be packaged and sold as "Dr. Sheffield's: The Original Toothpaste."

== Early life ==
Sheffield was born April 23, 1827 in North Stonington, Connecticut, the third of eight children of the Reverend John Sheffield and Eliza (née Lewis) Sheffield who married Feb. 6, 1820. Sheffield grew up in North Stonington, Connecticut, and was educated in its public schools.

== Career ==
As was the custom in the 18th and early 19th century, Sheffield began his career in 1850 training as an apprentice dentist with J. A. G. Comstock of New London, Connecticut. He furthered his dentistry education in New York City by working under Charles Allen and D. H. Porter.

In April 1852, Sheffield moved to New London, Connecticut and began a long and successful practice in dentistry and dental surgery. Dr. Sheffield became one of the most successful dentists and dental surgeons in the United States. Sheffield graduated, in 1865, from the Ohio College of Dental Surgery, the second oldest dental school in the United States, as a Doctor of Dental Surgery. In 1866, Dr. Sheffield received a naval commission from the President of the United States, Andrew Johnson, as a dental surgeon.

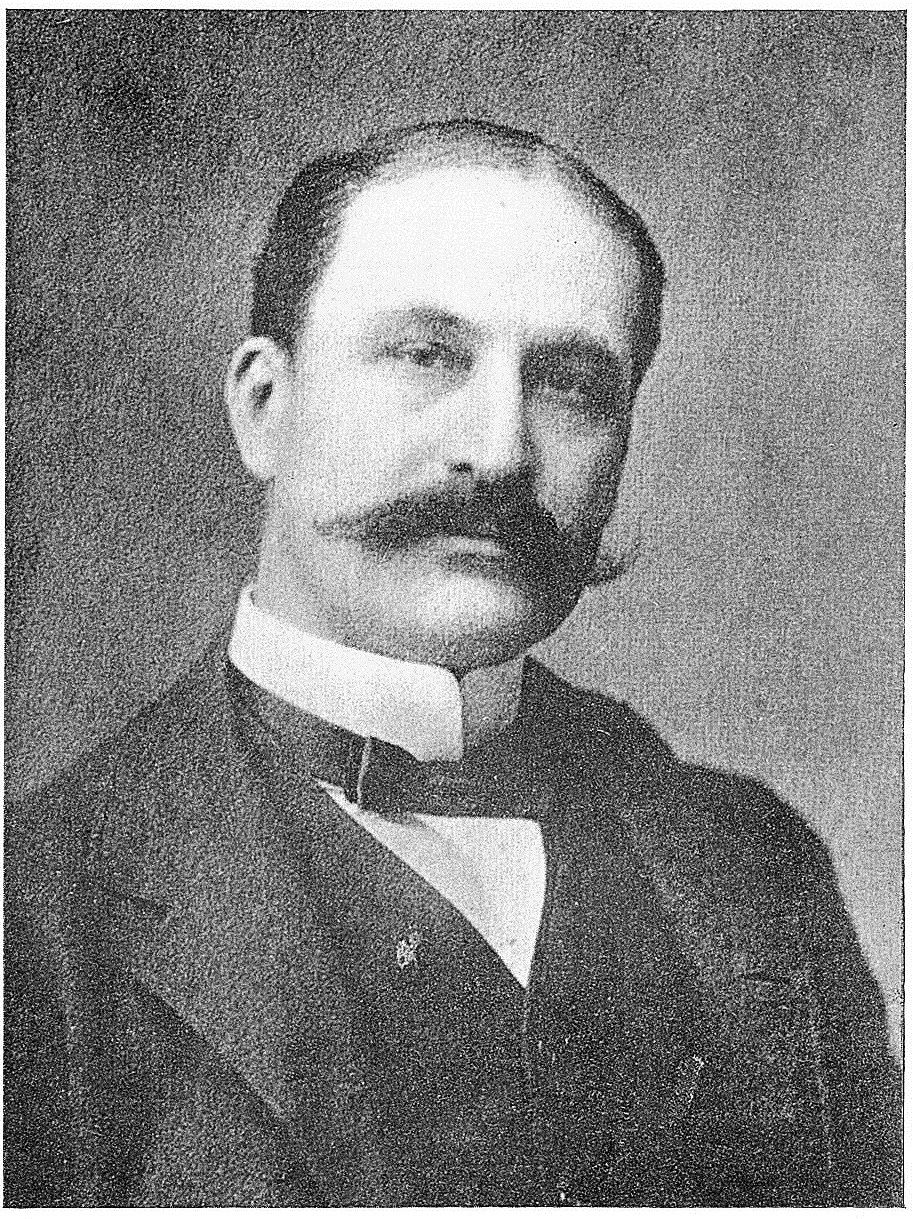
Sheffield's son and collaborator, Lucius T. Sheffield, DDM

== Family ==
Sheffield married Miss Harriet P. Browne, daughter of Richard and Julia Browne of Providence, Rhode Island. This marriage produced one child, a son, Lucius T. Sheffield (May 28, 1854 – September 20, 1901). Lucius Sheffield grew up in New London, Connecticut, and attended Norwich Free Academy. Lucius followed his father into dentistry and dental surgery. Lucius attended Harvard Medical School and graduated from Harvard's American Academy of Dental Medicine in 1878. After graduation, from 1878 to 1879, Lucius traveled to Paris, France, to study and work in dentistry and dental surgery.

Lucius was in Paris watching artists prepare their paint palettes when he realized the collapsible tubes they used to squeeze paint onto palettes could be used to squeeze his father's toothpaste onto a toothbrush in a sanitary manner.

== Inventions ==
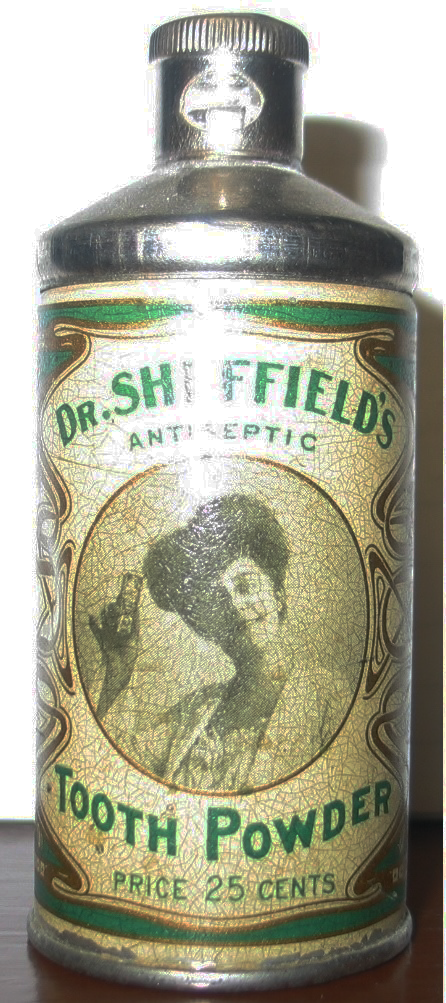
Sheffield's Tooth Powder

Tooth powder was popular up to World War II. Sheffield joined many doctors and dentists in formulating his own tooth powder for use on his patients and later as another product for his dentifrice company. Early in Sheffield's dental practice, he formulated a mouthwash which he used for years on his patients. When he and his son started the Sheffield Dentifrice Co. in 1880, they improved and reformulated that mouthwash and sold it as “Sheffield’s Elixir Balm” for the gums.

Based on contemporary news reports at the time, Sheffield conceived of a ready-made tooth crème in the mid-1870s and was using it on his patients with great praise from them. To this crème, he added various extracts of mints that left a very pleasing taste in the mouth of his patients which caused them to request samples of the toothpaste.

Sheffield shared his toothpaste formula with his son, L. T. Sheffield, who was a dentistry student at Harvard during this period. In response to toothpaste demands from patients, Sheffield started a manufacturing company, in early 1880. Initially, Sheffield was making toothpaste batches at his dental office at the corner of State Street and Green Street in New London, Connecticut. Demand grew rapidly and he was forced to build a laboratory and manufacturing facility behind his residence.

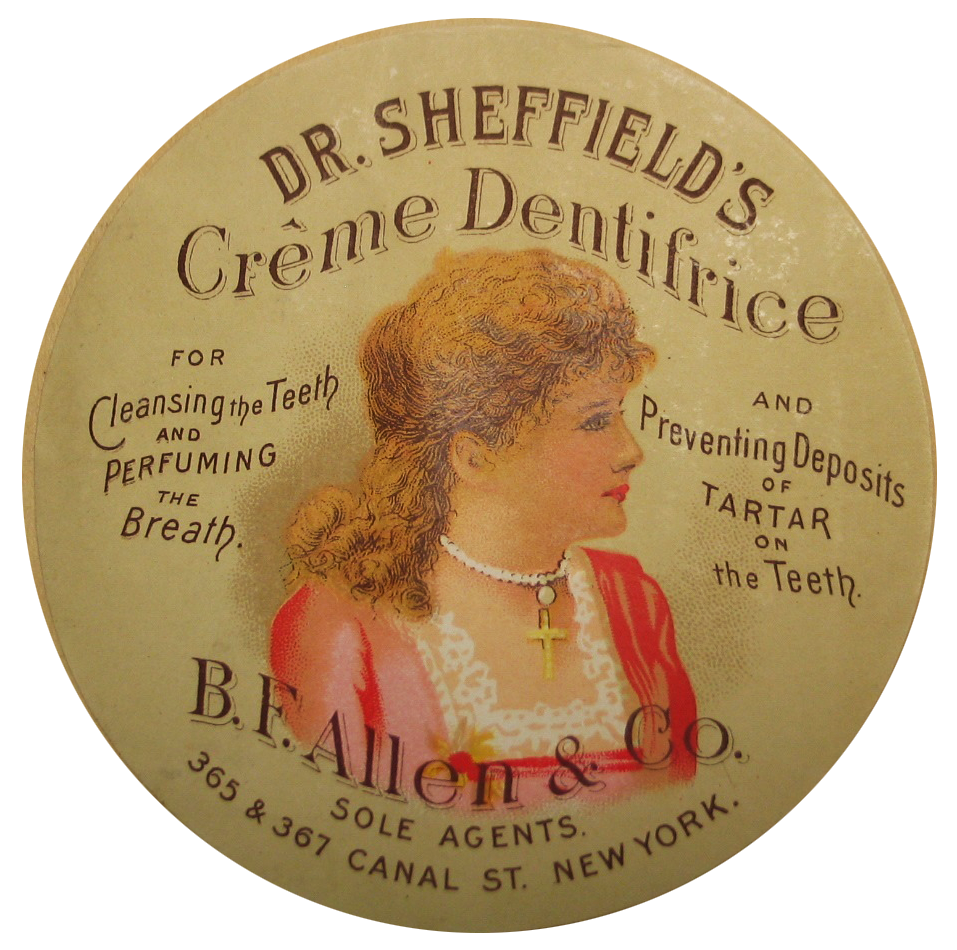
Jar-top label for Dr. Sheffield's Crème Dentifrice

The Sheffield Dentifrice Co. started producing his mouthwash and an entirely new product. Sheffield and his son called this product “Dr. Sheffield’s Crème Angelique Dentifrice”. This product was the first toothpaste and it was sold in collapsible tubes. Sheffield's son, now a Doctor of Dentistry, registered the trademark of that first toothpaste in 1881.

In 1883, Sheffield revised the original “Crème Angelique” toothpaste formula. He called the revised formula “Dr. Sheffield’s Crème Dentifrice” toothpaste. This revised formula remained in production years after Dr. Sheffield's death in 1897. After 1900, the Sheffield Dentifrice Co. became a contract toothpaste manufacturer for many individuals and companies and has remained so to the present day.

From 1880 to 1892, the Sheffield Dentifrice Co. purchased collapsible tubes to package the toothpaste. Beginning in 1892, the company started manufacturing its own collapsible tubes by purchasing tube manufacturing presses and fabricating its own tube-making machinery. In 1896, Colgate & Company began selling its own toothpaste that mimicked Sheffield's ready-made toothpaste and sold it in collapsible tubes like Sheffield. In 1900, the dentifrice company started a new company called the New England Collapsible Tube Co.

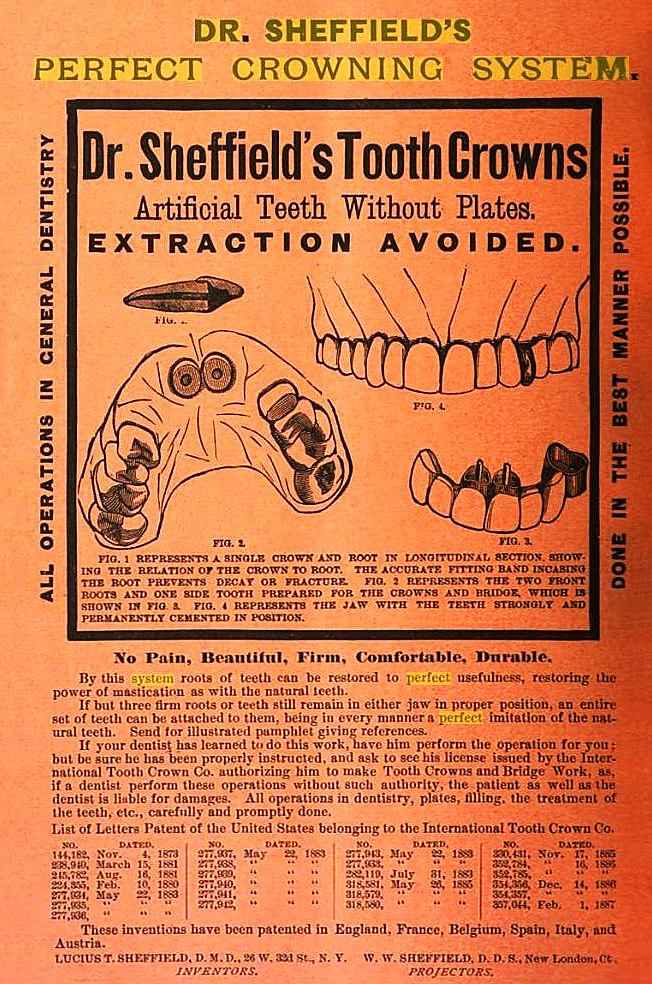
Advertisement for Dr. Sheffield's Perfect Crowning System, circa 1889

During his career, Sheffield worked at the cutting edge of dental prosthetics. He specialized in dental bridges and tooth crowns. In 1885, Sheffield was granted a patent for a dental bridge to hold multiple crowns together on broken or decayed teeth. In 1886, Sheffield and his son formed the International Tooth Crown Company, with Lucius T. Sheffield, as president and W. W. Sheffield, treasurer. This company purchased the crown patents of two prominent dentists, James E. Low and Cassius M. Richmond. All these crown and bridge patents were combined under one company which the two doctors advertised as Sheffield's Perfect Crowning System. Sheffield and his son received royalties from dentists around the world when they employed crowns and bridges covered under the Sheffields' patents.

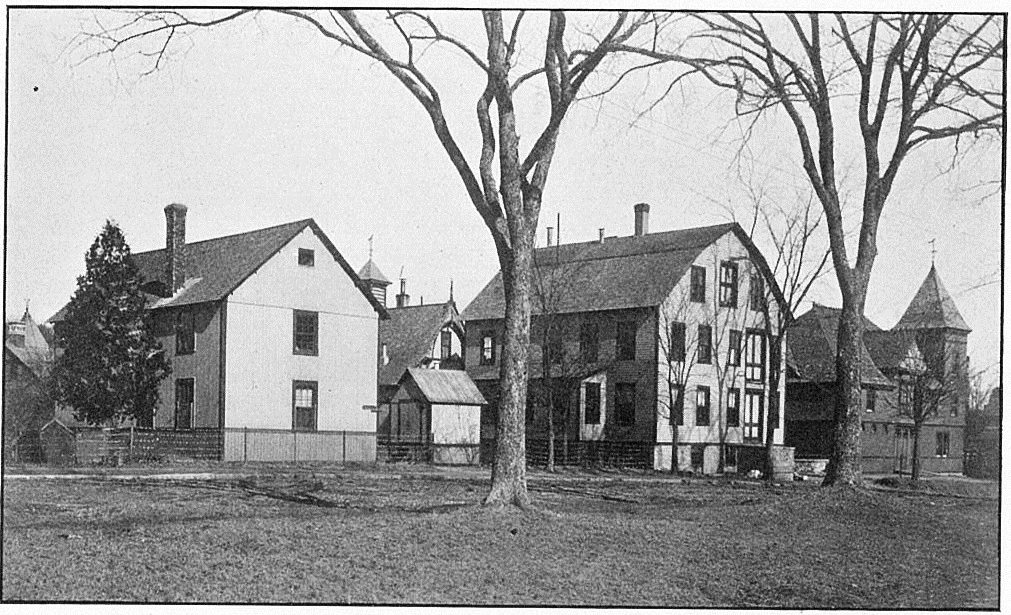
Sheffield's Lab, circa 1893. Modern day Sheffield Pharmaceuticals is located at that same site.
