= Toothpaste =

Substance to clean and maintain teeth

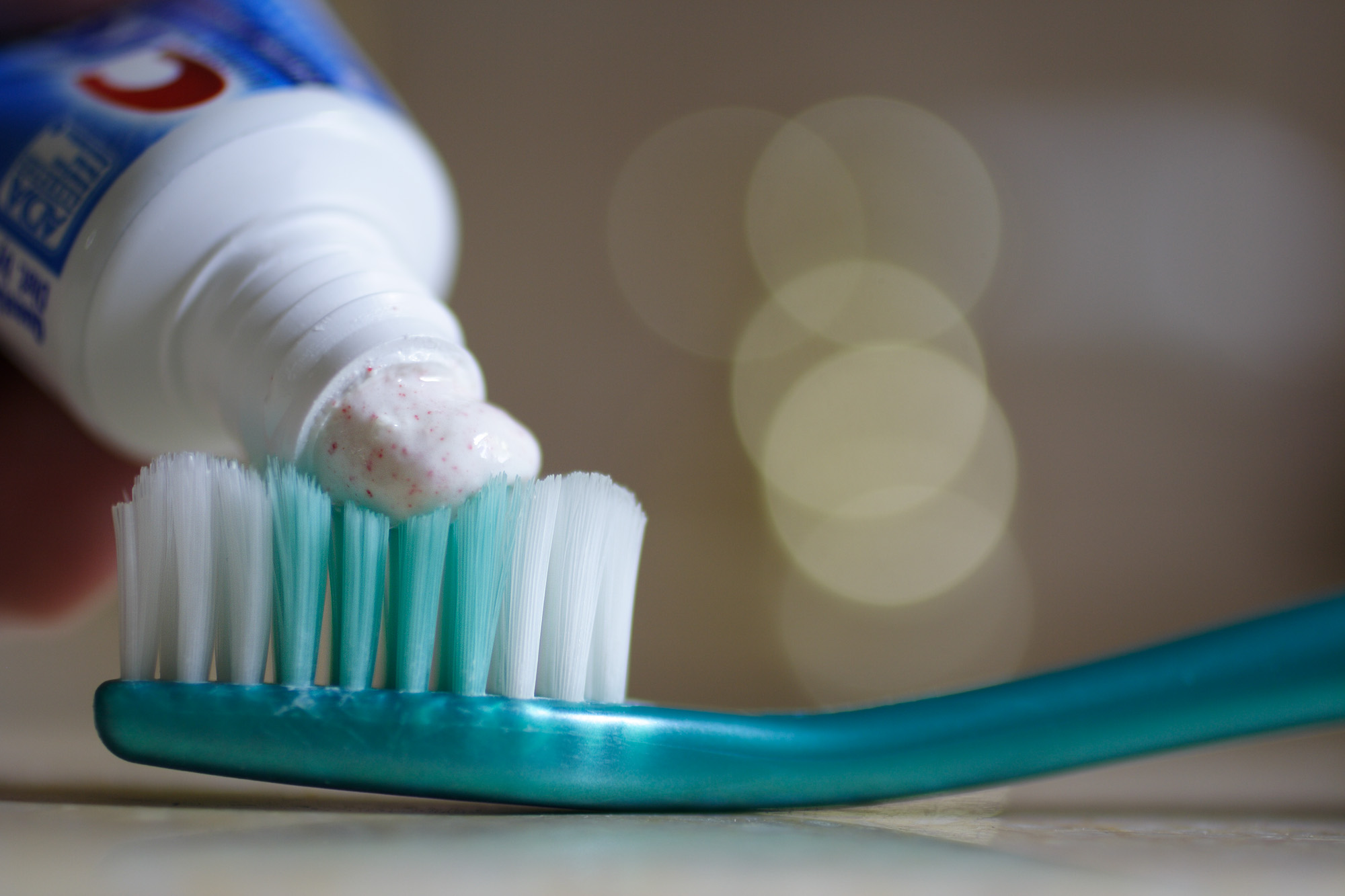
Toothpaste from a tube being applied to the bristles of a toothbrush

Toothpaste is a paste or gel dentifrice that is used with a toothbrush to clean and maintain the aesthetics of teeth. Toothpaste is used to promote oral hygiene: it is an abrasive that aids in removing dental plaque and food from the teeth, assists in suppressing halitosis, and delivers active ingredients (most commonly fluoride) to help prevent tooth decay (dental caries) and gum disease (gingivitis). Due to variations in composition and fluoride content, not all toothpastes are equally effective in maintaining oral health. The decline of tooth decay during the 20th century has been attributed to the introduction and regular use of fluoride-containing toothpastes worldwide. Large amounts of swallowed toothpaste can be poisonous. Common colors for toothpaste include white (sometimes with colored stripes or green tint) and blue.

== History ==
=== Early toothpastes ===
Since 5000 BC, the Egyptians made a tooth powder, which consisted of powdered ashes of ox hooves, pumice, powdered and burnt eggshells and myrrh. The Greeks, and then the Romans, improved the recipes by adding abrasives such as crushed bones and oyster shells.

In the 9th century, the Iraqi musician and designer Ziryab invented a type of toothpaste which he popularized throughout Islamic Spain. The exact ingredients of this toothpaste are unknown, but it was reported to have been both "functional and pleasant to taste". It is not known whether these early toothpastes were used alone, were to be rubbed onto the teeth with rags, or were to be used with early toothbrushes, such as neem-tree twigs and miswak. During Japan's Edo period, inventor Hiraga Gennai's Hika rakuyo (1769) contained advertisements for Sosekiko, a "toothpaste in a box." Toothpastes or powders came into general use in the 19th century.

=== Tooth powder ===
Tooth powders for use with toothbrushes came into general use in the 19th century in Britain. Most were homemade, with chalk, pulverized brick, or salt as ingredients. An 1866 Home Encyclopedia recommended pulverized charcoal, and cautioned that many patented tooth powders that were commercially marketed did more harm than good.

Arm & Hammer marketed a baking soda-based toothpowder in the United States until approximately 2000, and Colgate markets toothpowder in India and other countries.

=== Modern toothpaste ===
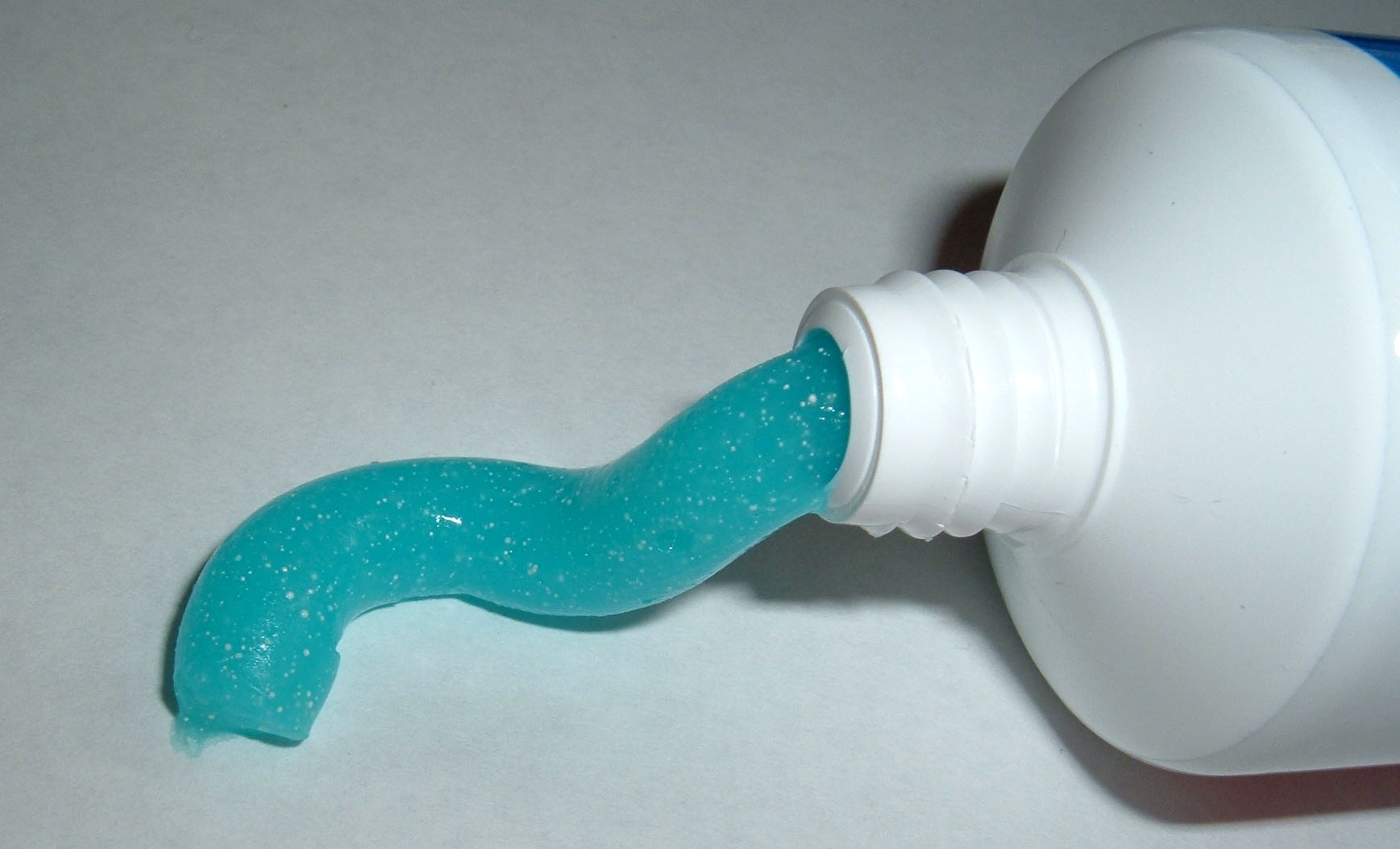
Modern toothpaste gel, in a tube

An 18th-century American and British toothpaste recipe called for burned bread. Another formula around this time called for dragon's blood (a resin), cinnamon, and burned alum.

In 1873 the Colgate company began the mass production of aromatic toothpaste in jars.

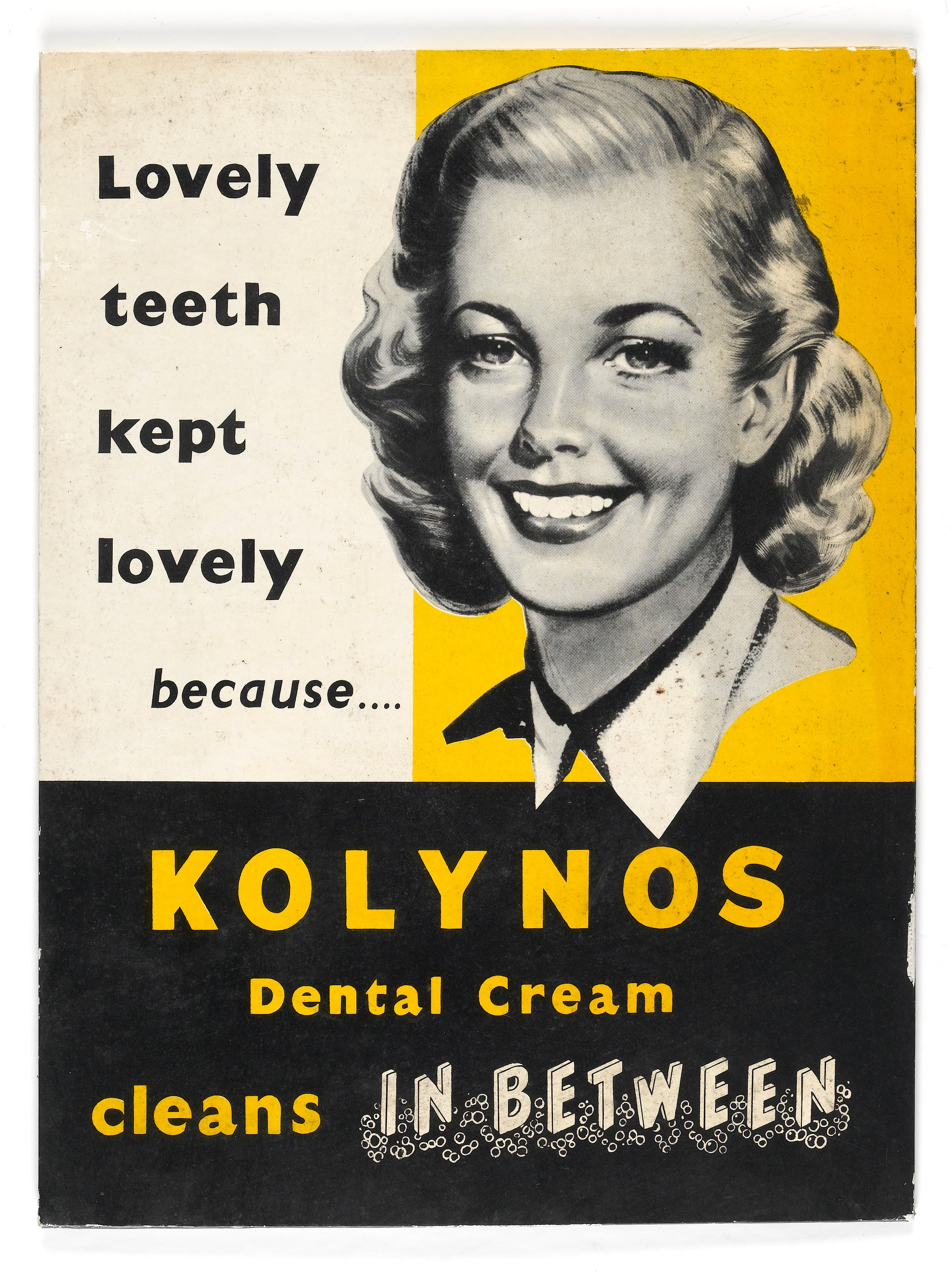
Promotional poster for the Kolynos toothpaste from the 1940s

By 1900, a paste made of hydrogen peroxide and baking soda was recommended for use with toothbrushes. Pre-mixed toothpastes were first marketed in the 19th century, but did not surpass the popularity of tooth-powder until World War I.

Together with Willoughby D. Miller, Newell Sill Jenkins developed the first toothpaste containing disinfectants, branded as Kolynos. The name is a combination of two Greek words, meaning "beautifier" and "disease preventer". Numerous attempts to produce the toothpaste by pharmacists in Europe proved uneconomic. After returning to the US, he continued experimenting with Harry Ward Foote (1875–1942), professor of chemistry at Sheffield Chemical Laboratory of Yale University. After 17 years of development of Kolynos and clinical trials, Jenkins retired and transferred the production and distribution to his son Leonard A. Jenkins, who brought the first toothpaste tubes on the market on April 13, 1908. Within a few years the company expanded in North America, Latin America, Europe and the Far East. A branch operation opened in London in 1909. In 1937, Kolynos was produced in 22 countries and sold in 88 countries. Kolynos has been sold mainly in South America and in Hungary. Colgate-Palmolive took over the production of American Home Products in 1995 at a cost of one billion US dollars.

Fluoride was first added to toothpastes in the 1890s. Tanagra, containing calcium fluoride as the active ingredient, was sold by Karl F. Toellner Company, of Bremen, Germany, based upon the early work of chemist Albert Deninger. An analogous invention by Roy Cross, of Kansas City, Missouri, was initially criticized by the American Dental Association (ADA) in 1937. Fluoride toothpastes developed in the 1950s received the ADA's approval. To develop the first ADA-approved fluoride toothpaste, Procter & Gamble started a research program in the early 1940s. In 1950, Procter & Gamble developed a joint research project team headed by Joseph C. Muhler at Indiana University to study new toothpaste with fluoride. In 1955, Procter & Gamble's Crest launched its first clinically proven fluoride-containing toothpaste. On August 1, 1960, the ADA reported that "Crest has been shown to be an effective anticavity (decay preventative) dentifrice that can be of significant value when used in a conscientiously applied program of oral hygiene and regular professional care."

=== Toothpaste tabs ===
To reduce plastic waste new developments use toothpaste powder compressed in tabs which before use are pulverized with the teeth in mouth. Combined with saliva this creates a mixture equivalent to toothpaste. The delivery in tabs reduces bulk by removing the water and are plastic free as there is no need for a tube.

== Usefulness ==
Toothpastes are useful to maintain dental health. Toothpastes containing fluoride are effective at preventing tooth decay. Toothpastes may also help to control and remove plaque build-up, promoting healthy gums. A 2016 systematic review indicated that using toothpaste when brushing the teeth does not necessarily impact the level of plaque removal. However, the active ingredients in toothpastes are able to prevent dental diseases with regular use.

== Ingredients ==
Toothpastes are derived from a variety of components, the three main ones being abrasives, fluoride, and detergent.

=== Abrasives ===
Abrasives constitute 8-20% of a typical toothpaste. These insoluble particles are designed to help remove plaque from the teeth. The removal of plaque inhibits the accumulation of tartar (calculus) helping to minimize the risk of gum disease. Representative abrasives include particles of aluminum hydroxide (Al(OH)_{3}), calcium carbonate (CaCO_{3}), magnesium carbonate (MgCO_{3}), sodium bicarbonate, various calcium hydrogen phosphates, various silicas and zeolites, and hydroxyapatite (Ca_{5}(PO_{4})_{3}OH).

After the Microbead-Free Waters Act of 2015, the use of microbeads in toothpaste has been discontinued in the US. Some brands contain powdered white mica, which acts as a mild abrasive, and also adds a cosmetic glittery shimmer to the paste. The polishing of teeth removes stains from tooth surfaces, but has not been shown to improve dental health over and above the effects of the removal of plaque and calculus.

Abrasives, like the dental polishing agents used in dentists' offices, also cause a small amount of enamel erosion which is termed "polishing" action. The abrasive effect of toothpaste is indicated by its RDA value. Toothpastes with RDA values above 250 are potentially damaging to the surfaces of teeth. The American National Standards Institute and American Dental Association considers toothpastes with an RDA below 250 to be safe and effective for a lifetime of use.

=== Fluorides ===
Effect of fluoridation on hydroxyapatite in tooth enamel

Fluoride in various forms is the most popular and effective active ingredient in toothpaste to prevent cavities. Fluoride is present in small amounts in plants, animals, and some natural water sources. The additional fluoride in toothpaste has beneficial effects on the formation of dental enamel and bones. Sodium fluoride (NaF) is the most common source of fluoride, but stannous fluoride (SnF_{2}), and sodium monofluorophosphate (Na_{2}PO_{3}F) are also used. At similar fluoride concentrations, toothpastes containing stannous fluoride have been shown to be more effective than toothpastes containing sodium fluoride for reducing the incidence of dental caries and dental erosion, as well as reducing gingivitis. Some stannous fluoride-containing toothpastes also contain ingredients that allow for better stain and calculus removal. A systematic review revealed stabilised stannous fluoride-containing toothpastes had a positive effect on the reduction of plaque, gingivitis and staining, with a significant reduction in calculus and halitosis compared to other toothpastes. Furthermore, numerous clinical trials have shown gluconate chelated stannous fluoride toothpastes possess superior protection against dental erosion and dentine hypersensitivity compared to other fluoride-containing and fluoride-free toothpastes.

Much of the toothpaste sold in the United States has 1,000 to 1,100 parts per million fluoride. In European countries, such as the UK or Greece, the fluoride content is often higher; a sodium fluoride content of 0.312% w/w (1,450 ppm fluoride) or stannous fluoride content of 0.454% w/w (1,100 ppm fluoride) is common. All of these concentrations are likely to prevent tooth decay, according to a 2019 Cochrane review. Concentrations below 1,000 ppm are not likely to be preventive, and the preventive effect increases with concentration. Clinical trials support the use of high fluoride (5,000 ppm fluoride) dentifrices, for prevention of root caries in elderly adults by reducing the amount of plaque accumulated, decreasing the number of mutans streptococci and lactobacilli and possibly promoting calcium fluoride deposits to a higher degree than after the use of traditional fluoride containing dentifrices.

Most toothpaste products have a shelf life of about two years, after which the fluoride and antibacterial properties may become less effective. While expired toothpaste is generally safe to use, regulatory bodies like the FDA require expiration dates on fluoride-containing toothpaste to ensure optimal effectiveness.

=== Surfactants ===
Many, although not all, toothpastes contain sodium lauryl sulfate (SLS) or related surfactants (detergents). SLS is found in many other personal care products as well, such as shampoo, and is mainly a foaming agent, which enables uniform distribution of toothpaste, improving its cleansing power.

=== Other components ===
==== Antibacterial agents ====
Triclosan, an antibacterial agent, is a common toothpaste ingredient in the United Kingdom. Triclosan or zinc chloride prevent gingivitis and, according to the American Dental Association, helps reduce tartar and bad breath. A 2006 review of clinical research concluded there was evidence for the effectiveness of 0.30% triclosan in reducing plaque and gingivitis. Another Cochrane review in 2013 has found that triclosan achieved a 22% reduction in plaque, and in gingivitis, a 48% reduction in bleeding gums. However, there was insufficient evidence to show a difference in fighting periodontitis and there was no evidence either of any harmful effects associated with the use of triclosan toothpastes for more than 3 years. The evidence relating to plaque and gingivitis was considered to be of moderate quality while for periodontitis was low quality. Recently, triclosan has been removed as an ingredient from well-known toothpaste formulations. This may be attributed to concerns about adverse effects associated with triclosan exposure. Triclosan use in cosmetics has been positively correlated with triclosan levels in human tissues, plasma and breast milk, and is considered to have potential neurotoxic effects. Long-term studies are needed to substantiate these concerns.

Chlorhexidine is another antimicrobial agent used in toothpastes; however, it is more commonly added in mouthwash products. Sodium laureth sulfate, a foaming agent, is a common toothpaste ingredient that also possesses some antimicrobial activities. There are also many commercial products available in the market containing different essential oils, herbal ingredients (e.g. chamomile, neem, chitosan, aloe vera), and natural or plant extracts (e.g. hinokitiol). These ingredients are claimed by the manufacturers to fight plaque, bad breath and prevent gum disease. A 2020 systematic metareview found that herbal toothpastes are as effective as non-herbal toothpastes in reducing dental plaque at shorter period of follow-up (4 weeks). However, this evidence comes from low-quality studies.

The stannous (tin) ion, commonly added to toothpastes as stannous fluoride or stannous chloride, has been shown to have antibacterial effects in the mouth. Research has shown that stannous fluoride-containing toothpaste inhibits extracellular polysaccharide (EPS) production in a multispecies biofilm greater than sodium fluoride-containing toothpaste. This is thought to contribute to a reduction in plaque and gingivitis when using stannous fluoride-containing toothpastes when compared to other toothpastes, and has been evidenced through numerous clinical trials. In addition to its antibacterial properties, stabilised stannous fluoride toothpastes have been shown to protect against dental erosion and dentine hypersensitivity, making it a multifunctional component in toothpaste formulations.

==== Flavorants ====
Toothpaste comes in a variety of colors and flavors, intended to encourage use of the product. The three most common flavorants are peppermint, spearmint, and wintergreen. Toothpaste flavored with peppermint-anise oil is popular in the Mediterranean region. These flavors are provided by the respective oils, e.g. peppermint oil. More exotic flavors include Anethole anise, apricot, bubblegum, cinnamon, fennel, lavender, neem, ginger, vanilla, lemon, orange, and pine. Alternatively, unflavored toothpastes exist.

==== Remineralizing agents ====
Chemical repair (remineralization) of early tooth decay is promoted naturally by saliva. However, this process can be enhanced by various remineralisation agents. Fluoride promotes remineralization, but is limited by bioavailable calcium. Casein phosphopeptide stabilised amorphous calcium phosphate (CPP-ACP) is a toothpaste ingredient containing bioavailable calcium that has been widely researched to be the most clinically effective remineralization agent that enhances the action of saliva and fluoride. Peptide-based systems, hydroxyapatite nanocrystals and a variety of calcium phosphates have been advocated as remineralization agents; however, more clinical evidence is required to substantiate their effectiveness.

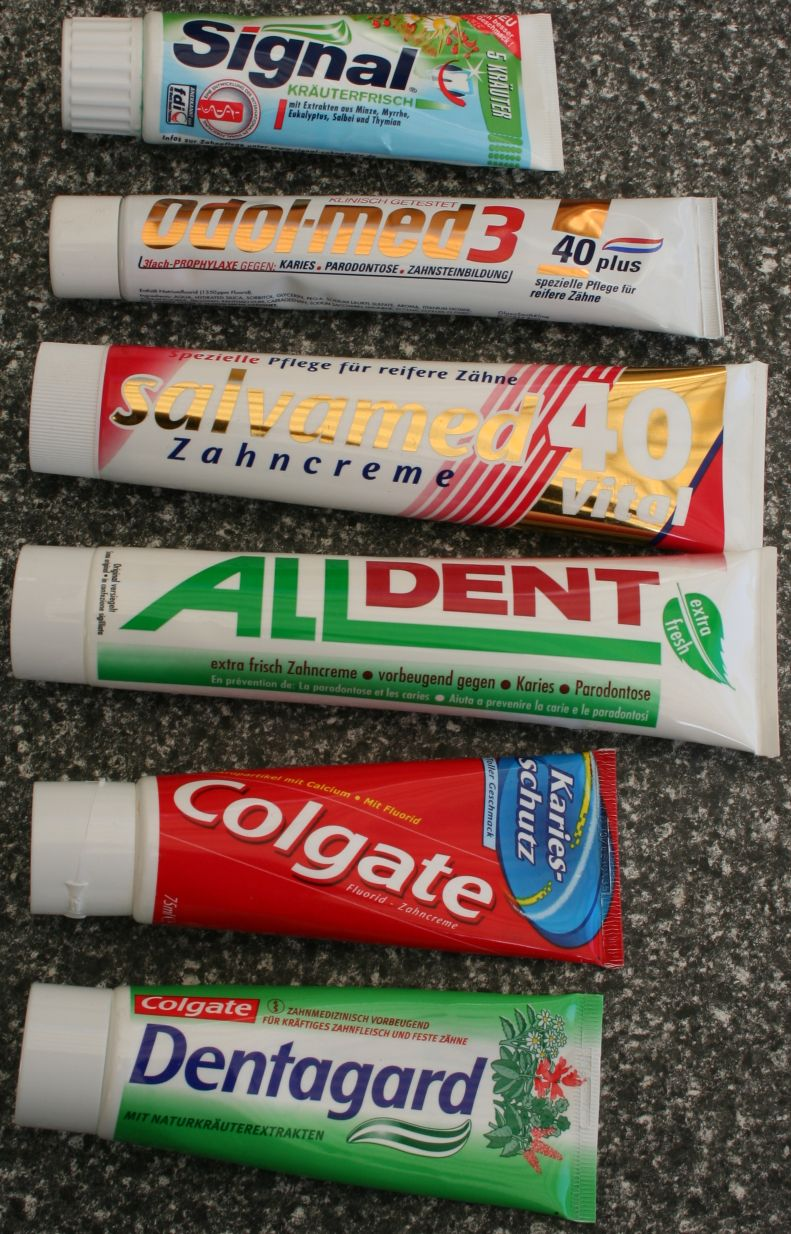
Toothpaste is sold in many brands.

==== Miscellaneous components ====
Agents are added to suppress the tendency of toothpaste to dry into a powder. Included are various sugar alcohols, such as glycerol, sorbitol, or xylitol, or related derivatives, such as 1,2-propylene glycol and polyethyleneglycol. Strontium chloride or potassium nitrate is included in some toothpastes to reduce sensitivity. Two systemic meta-analysis reviews reported that arginine, and calcium sodium phosphosilicate – CSPS containing toothpastes are also effective in alleviating dentinal hypersensitivity respectively. Another randomized clinical trial found superior effects when both formulas were combined.

Sodium polyphosphate is added to minimize the formation of tartar.

Chlorohexidine mouthwash has been popular for its positive effect on controlling plaque and gingivitis, however, a systemic review studied the effects of Chlorhexidine toothpastes and found insufficient evidence to support its use, tooth surface discoloration was observed as a side effect upon using it, which is considered a negative side effect that can affect patients' compliance.

Sodium hydroxide, also known as lye or caustic soda, is listed as an inactive ingredient in some toothpaste, for example Colgate Total.

=== Xylitol ===
A systematic review reported two out of ten studies by the same authors on the same population showed toothpastes with xylitol as an ingredient were more effective at preventing dental caries in permanent teeth of children than toothpastes containing fluoride alone. Furthermore, xylitol has not been found to cause any harmful effects. However, further investigation into the efficacy of toothpastes containing xylitol is required because the available studies are of low quality and high risk of bias.

== Safety ==
=== Fluoride ===
Fluoride-containing toothpaste can be acutely toxic if swallowed in large amounts, but instances are exceedingly rare and result from prolonged and excessive use of toothpaste (i.e. several tubes per week). Approximately 15 mg/kg body weight is the acute lethal dose, even though as small amount as 5 mg/kg may be fatal to some children.

The risk of using fluoride is low enough that the use of full-strength toothpaste (1350–1500 ppm fluoride) is advised for all ages. However, smaller volumes are used for young children, for example, a smear of toothpaste until three years old. A major concern of dental fluorosis is for children under 12 months ingesting excessive fluoride through toothpaste. Nausea and vomiting are also problems which might arise with topical fluoride ingestion.

=== Diethylene glycol ===
The inclusion of sweet-tasting but toxic diethylene glycol in Chinese-made toothpaste led to a recall in 2007 involving multiple toothpaste brands in several nations. The world outcry made Chinese officials ban the practice of using diethylene glycol in toothpaste.

=== Triclosan ===
Reports have suggested triclosan, an active ingredient in many kinds of toothpastes, can combine with chlorine in tap water to form chloroform. An animal study revealed the chemical might modify hormone regulation, and many other lab researches proved bacteria might be able to develop resistance to triclosan in a way which can help them to resist antibiotics also.

=== Polyethylene glycol – PEG ===
PEG is a common ingredient in some of the formulas of toothpastes; it is a hydrophilic polymer that acts as a dispersant in toothpastes. Also, it is used in many cosmetic and pharmaceutical formulas, for example: ointments, osmotic laxatives, some of the nonsteroidal anti-inflammatory drugs, other medications and household products. However, 37 cases of PEG hypersensitivity (delayed and immediate) to PEG-containing substances have been reported since 1977, suggesting that they have unrecognized allergenic potential.

=== Miscellaneous issues and debates ===
With the exception of toothpaste intended to be used on pets such as dogs and cats, and toothpaste used by astronauts, most toothpaste is not intended to be swallowed, and doing so may cause nausea or diarrhea. Tartar fighting toothpastes have been debated. Sodium lauryl sulfate (SLS) has been proposed to increase the frequency of mouth ulcers in some people, as it can dry out the protective layer of oral tissues, causing the underlying tissues to become damaged. In studies conducted by the university of Oslo on recurrent aphthous ulcers, it was found that SLS has a denaturing effect on the oral mucin layer, with high affinity for proteins, thereby increasing epithelial permeability. In a double-blind cross-over study, a significantly higher frequency of aphthous ulcers was demonstrated when patients brushed with an SLS-containing versus a detergent-free toothpaste. Also patients with Oral Lichen Planus who avoided SLS-containing toothpaste benefited.

=== Alteration of taste perception ===
After using toothpaste, orange juice and other fruit juices are known to have an unpleasant taste if consumed shortly afterwards. Sodium lauryl sulfate, used as a surfactant in toothpaste, alters taste perception. It can break down phospholipids that inhibit taste receptors for sweetness, giving food a bitter taste. In contrast, apples are known to taste more pleasant after using toothpaste. Distinguishing between the hypotheses that the bitter taste of orange juice results from stannous fluoride or from sodium lauryl sulfate is still an unresolved issue and it is thought that the menthol added for flavor may also take part in the alteration of taste perception when binding to lingual cold receptors.

=== Whitening toothpastes ===
Many toothpastes make whitening claims. Abrasion is the principal way that toothpaste removes stains, and toothpastes that are not marketed as whitening can still remove stains by abrasion. Some of these toothpastes contain peroxide, the same ingredient found in tooth bleaching gels. Whitening toothpaste cannot alter the natural color of teeth or reverse discoloration by penetrating surface stains or decay. To remove surface stains, whitening toothpaste may include abrasives to gently polish the teeth or additives such as sodium tripolyphosphate to break down or dissolve stains. When used twice a day, whitening toothpaste typically takes two to four weeks to make teeth appear whiter. Whitening toothpaste is generally safe for daily use, but excessive use might damage tooth enamel. A recent systematic review in 2017 concluded that nearly all dentifrices that are specifically formulated for tooth whitening were shown to have a beneficial effect in reducing extrinsic stains, irrespective of whether or not a chemical discoloration agent was added. However, the whitening process can permanently reduce the strength of the teeth, as the process scrapes away a protective outer layer of enamel.

=== Herbal and natural toothpastes ===
Herbal toothpastes are marketed to consumers who wish to avoid some of the artificial ingredients commonly found in regular toothpastes. The ingredients found in so-called natural toothpastes vary widely but often include baking soda, aloe, eucalyptus oil, myrrh, camomile, calendula, neem, toothbrush tree, plant extract (strawberry extract), and essential oils. Many herbal toothpastes do not contain fluoride or sodium lauryl sulfate.

A 2020 meta-analysis showed some evidence for the efficacy of herbal toothpaste, albeit from poor quality studies. According to a study by the Delhi Institute of Pharmaceutical Sciences and Research, many of the herbal toothpastes being sold in India were adulterated with nicotine.

Charcoal has also been incorporated in toothpaste formulas; however, there is no evidence to determine its safety and effectiveness, and the American Dental Association does not recommend its use.

== Government regulation ==
In the United States toothpaste is regulated by the U.S. Food and Drug Administration as a cosmetic, except for ingredients with a medical purpose, such as fluoride, which are regulated as drugs. Drugs require scientific studies and FDA approval in order to be legally marketed in the United States, but cosmetic ingredients do not require pre-approval, except for color additives. The FDA does have labelling and requirements and bans certain ingredients.

== Striped toothpaste ==
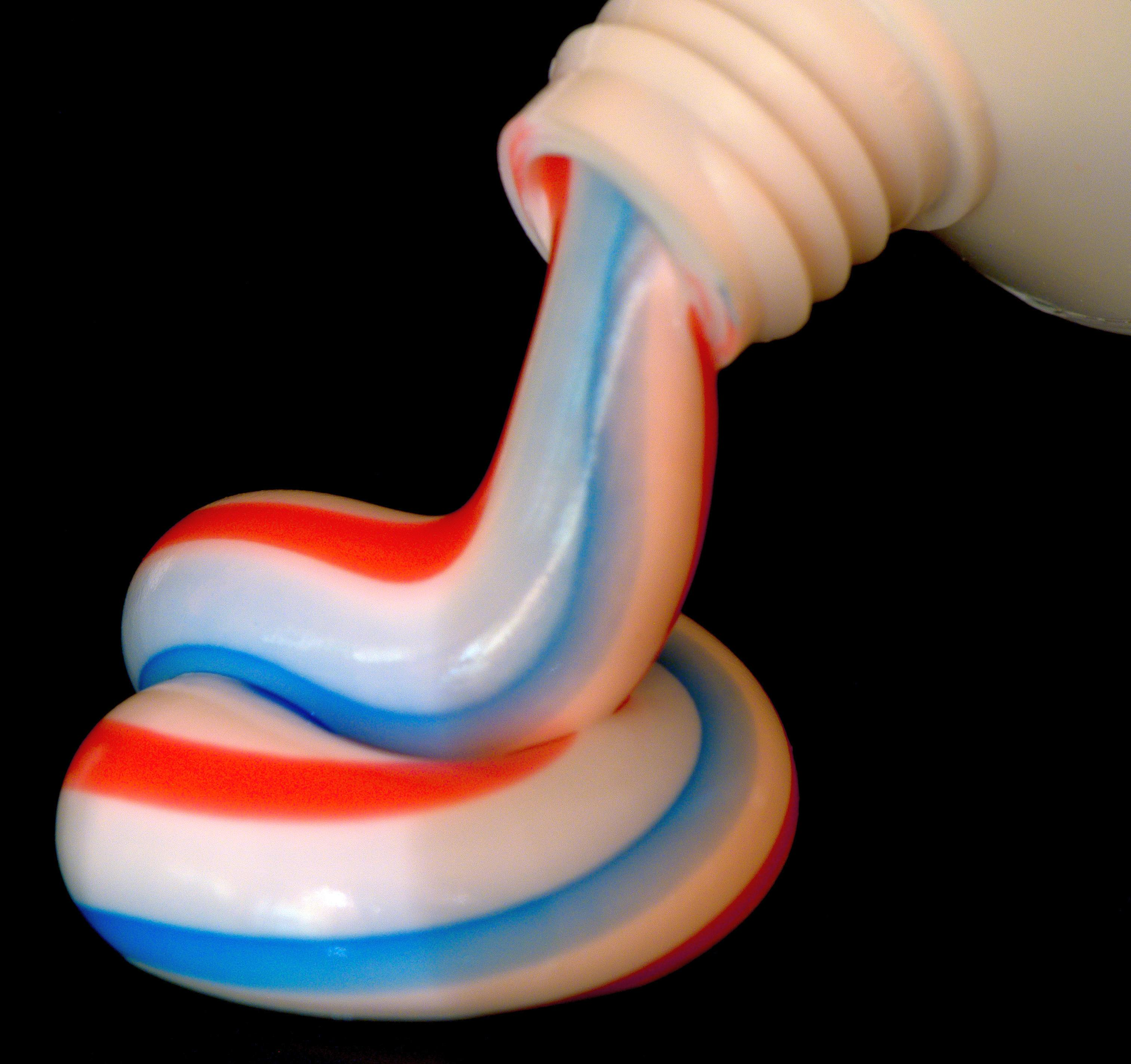
A brand of red, blue and white striped toothpaste

Striped toothpaste was invented by Leonard Marraffino in 1955. The patent (US patent 2,789,731, issued 1957) was subsequently sold to Unilever, which marketed the novelty under the Stripe brand-name in the early 1960s. This was followed by the introduction of the Signal brand in Europe in 1965 (UK patent 813,514). Although Stripe was initially very successful, it never again achieved the 8% market share that it cornered during its second year.

The red area represents the material used for stripes, and the rest is the main toothpaste material. The two materials are not in separate compartments; they are sufficiently viscous that they will not mix. Applying pressure to the tube causes the main material to issue out through the pipe. Simultaneously, some of the pressure is forwarded to the stripe-material, which is thereby pressed onto the main material through holes in the pipe.

Marraffino's design, which remains in use for single-color stripes, is simple. The main material, usually white, sits at the crimp end of the toothpaste tube and makes up most of its bulk. A thin pipe, through which that carrier material will flow, descends from the nozzle to it. The stripe-material (this was red in Stripe) fills the gap between the carrier material and the top of the tube. The two materials are not in separate compartments, but they are sufficiently viscous that they will not mix. When pressure is applied to the toothpaste tube, the main material squeezes down the thin pipe to the nozzle. Simultaneously, the pressure applied to the main material causes pressure to be forwarded to the stripe material, which thereby issues out through small holes (in the side of the pipe) onto the main carrier material as it is passing those holes.

In 1990, Colgate-Palmolive was granted a patent (USPTO 4,969,767) for two differently colored stripes. In this scheme, the inner pipe has a cone-shaped plastic guard around it, and about halfway up its length. Between the guard and the nozzle-end of the tube is a space for the material for one color, which issues out of holes in the pipe. On the other side of the guard is space for second stripe-material, which has its own set of holes.

In 2016, Colgate-Palmolive was granted a patent (USPTO U.S. patent 20,160,228,347) for suitable sorts of differently colored toothpastes to be filled directly into tubes to produce a striped mix without any separate compartments. This required adjustment of the different components' behavior (rheology) so that stripes are produced when the tube is squeezed.

Striped toothpaste should not be confused with layered toothpaste. Layered toothpaste requires a multi-chamber design (e.g. USPTO 5,020,694), in which two or three layers extrude out of the nozzle. This scheme, like that of pump dispensers (USPTO 4,461,403), is more complicated (and thus, more expensive to manufacture) than either the Marraffino design or the Colgate designs.

The iconic depiction of a wave-shaped blob of toothpaste sitting on a toothbrush is called a "nurdle".

== Dispensing ==
Toothpaste is usually dispensed via a collapsible tube or with a more rigid pump. Several traditional and innovative designs have been developed. The dispenser must be matched to the flow properties of the toothpaste.

In 1880, Doctor Washington Sheffield of New London, CT manufactured toothpaste into a collapsible tube, Dr. Sheffield's Creme Dentifrice. He had the idea after his son traveled to Paris and saw painters using paint from tubes. In York in 1896, Colgate-Palmolive Dental Cream was packaged in collapsible tubes imitating Sheffield. The original collapsible toothpaste tubes were made of lead.

== See also ==
- Dental floss
- Mouthwash
- Fluoride therapy
- List of toothpaste brands
- Environmental impact of pharmaceuticals and personal care products – Effects of drugs on the environment
