= Kolibree =

Kolibree is a French company based in Neuilly-sur-Seine, France that is known for developing a smart toothbrush. Colibri means "hummingbird" in French; perhaps a reference to their signature product's light weight, about 64g.

== Kickstarter ==
In April 2014, the company launched a Kickstarter crowdfunding campaign for its device and raised over $100,000.

== Design ==
The toothbrush connects via Bluetooth to a smartphone app named Kolibree as well, and can tell users whether they are brushing well. Also, available is a choice of video games, in which good brushing is rewarded with high scores in the game. The toothbrush has removable heads; thus the same brush can be shared by different people without worry of contamination.

== AI toothbrush ==
In 2017, at CES Las Vegas, Kolibree introduced ARA, an updated version of its toothbrush, promising AI software that records and detects bad brushing habits. Using computer vision technology, motion tracking and the phone's front-facing camera, incentivizes kids to brush their teeth with an augmented reality gaming app.

== AR toothbrush ==
In 2018 at CES Las Vegas, Kolibree introduced Magik, a kids' version of its toothbrush with Augmented Reality detection that helps children play with a smartphone App while cleaning their teeth. The toothbrush retailed for less than $30.

== "hum" by Colgate ==
In August 2020, Colgate-Palmolive unveiled to Wall Street the "hum" smart toothbrush, developed in partnership with Kolibree. Reviews mentioned the toothbrush as being "extremely accurate" and "smaller and lighter" than other electric toothbrushes.

== Kolibree relaunches itself with Kolibree Kids ==
In 2026 at CES Las Vegas, Kolibree introduced its new product Kolibree Kids with a new app, new features, a new toothbrush, and a new design. New Kolibree provides a brushing method for kids, doubled by education on how to wash their faces and hands. The two core missions of Kolibree Kids was to develop good habits for kids and end the brushing battle with parents. Kolibree Kids is retained by Forbes as one of the top 10 health innovations.
