= Dentifrice =

Agent used to clean and polish teeth

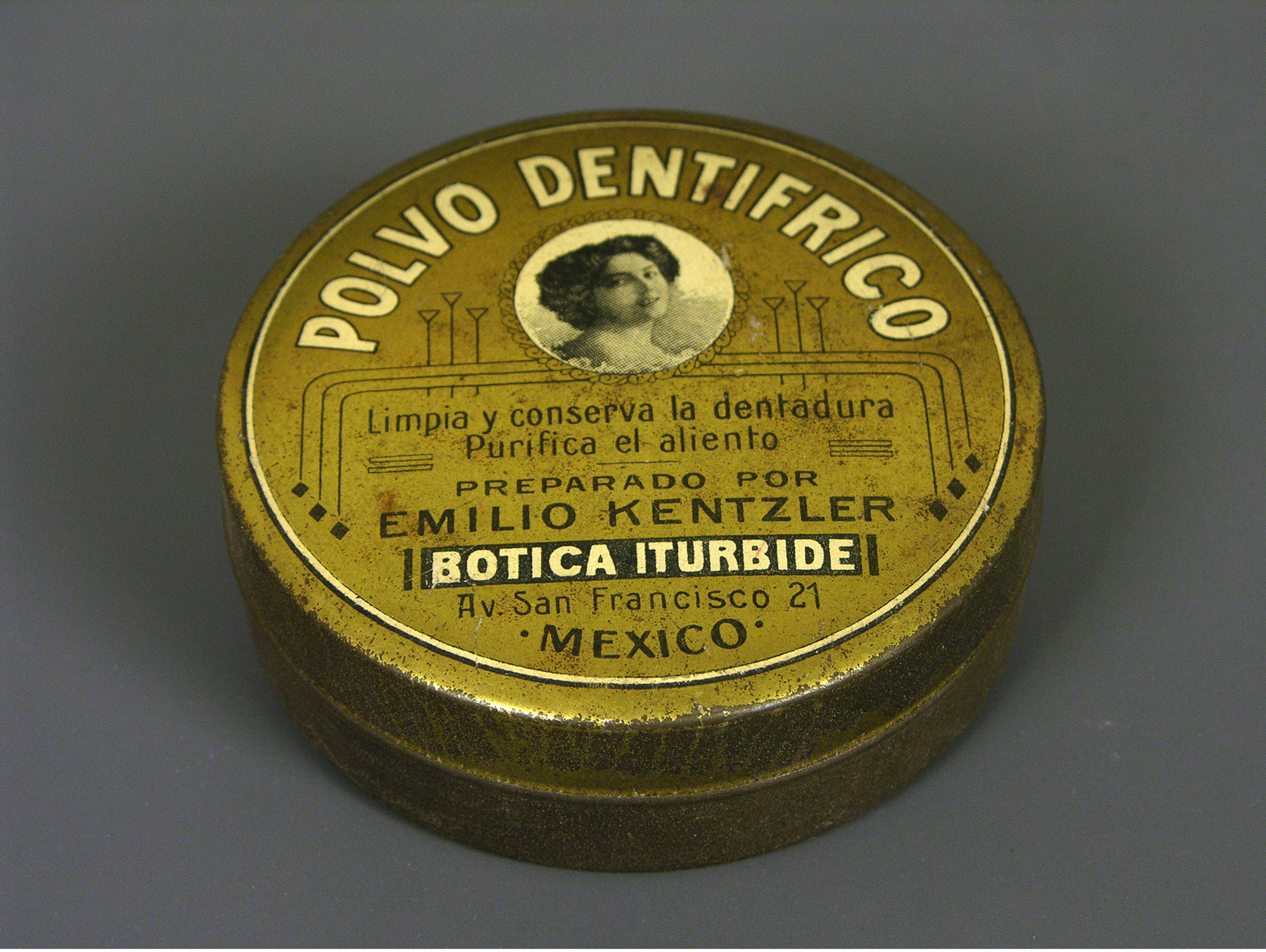
Botica Iturbide brand tooth powder (early 20th century, Mexico) from the permanent collection of the Museo del Objeto del Objeto

Dentifrices, including toothpowder and toothpaste, are agents used along with a toothbrush to aid in removal of dental plaque. They are supplied in paste, powder or gel. Many dentifrices have been produced over the years, some focusing on marketing strategies to sell products, such as offering whitening capabilities. The most essential dentifrice recommended by dentists is toothpaste which is used in conjunction with a toothbrush to help remove food debris and dental plaque. Dentifrice is also the French word for toothpaste.

== Types ==
=== Toothpaste ===
Toothpaste is a dentifrice used in conjunction with a toothbrush to help maintain oral hygiene. Toothpastes are generally beneficial for maintaining dental health. Toothpastes containing fluoride are effective in preventing tooth decay. The essential components are an abrasive, binder, surfactant and humectant. Other ingredients are also used.

While ordinary toothpaste can effectively clean teeth, some formulations are designed to meet specific needs:

- Fluoride toothpaste for the prevention of tooth decay
- Toothpaste for sensitive teeth containing potassium nitrate or stannous fluoride.
- Formulations to control tartar buildup in people prone to its accumulation.
- Whitening toothpaste with mild abrasive particles (use with caution to avoid damaging enamel).

The main purpose of the paste is to help remove debris and plaque with some marketed to serve accessory functions such as breath freshening and teeth whitening.

Toothpaste containing fluoride can be acutely toxic if swallowed in large amounts, but such cases are extremely rare and are the result of prolonged and excessive use of toothpaste (for example, several tubes per week). The acute lethal dose is approximately 15 mg/kg body weight, although even a small amount of 5 mg/kg can be fatal to some children.

=== Tooth powder ===
Tooth powder was historically used among the Romans to clean and whiten teeth, to fix them when loose, to strengthen the gums, and to assuage toothache. They made tooth powder from a variety of substances, such as the bones, hoofs, and horns of certain animals; crabs; oyster and murex shells; and egg-shells. These ingredients were reduced to a fine powder, sometimes after having been previously burnt. Some versions contained honey, ground myrrh, nitre, salt, and hartshorn, which would be added after the initial powdering process. Pliny the Elder reported the use of pounded pumice as a dentifrice. Arguably the best-known mention of tooth care among the Romans is found in a letter by Apuleius, who complains that using tooth powder is nothing to be ashamed of, especially compared to the "utterly repulsive things they do in Hispania (now Spain)." Apuleius quotes Catullus in saying that he would be using his own urine "to brush his teeth and his red gums."

By 1924, diatomaceous earth was mined for tooth powder. In modern times, baking soda has been the most commonly used tooth powder.

The use of powdered substances such as charcoal, brick, and salt for cleaning teeth has been historically widespread in India, particularly in rural areas. Modern tooth powder has been positioned as a cost-effective substitute for toothpaste, as it can be applied with the index finger without requiring use of a toothbrush.

== See also ==
- List of toothpaste brands
