= Sheffield Pharmaceuticals =

American pharmaceutical company

- Type: Private
- Industry: Pharmaceutical
- Founded: 1880; 146 years ago (as Sheffield Dentifrice Company)
- Founder: Washington Sheffield
- Headquarters: New London, Connecticut, United States
- Products: Pharmaceutical products
- Website: www.sheffieldpharma.com

Sheffield Pharmaceuticals is a manufacturer of over the counter pharmaceutical products to retailers in the United States. It manufactures and sells products under its own labels and privately for other companies, and is an FDA registered cGMP facility. The company was founded in 1880 as the Sheffield Dentifrice Company by Washington Sheffield, the inventor of modern toothpaste.

== History ==
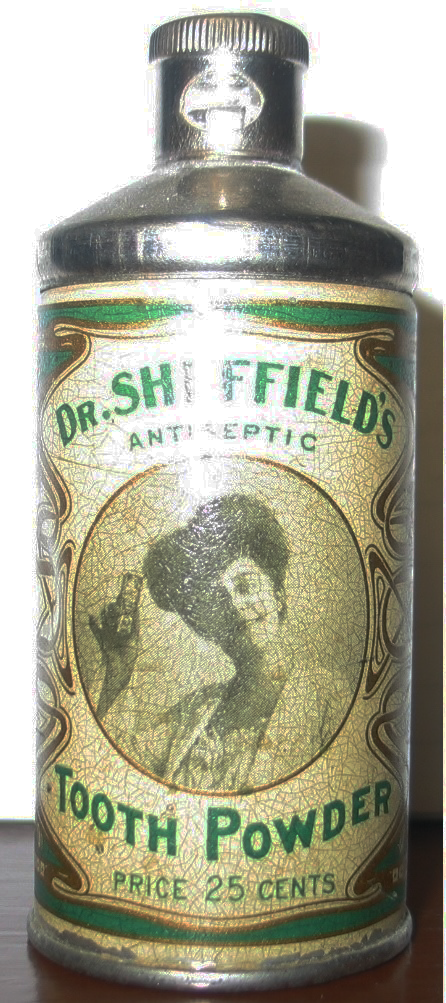
Dr. Sheffield's tooth powder, a predecessor to toothpaste

Sheffield was a respected dentist and dental surgeon of his time. In the mid-1870s, he thought of a new tooth cleaning product in a cream form as a replacement for the tooth powders common at the time. He made his own dental cream in his office, added mint extracts to it so as to improve the flavor, and used it on his patients who expressed their liking for it. After establishing his company in 1880, with the help of his son, he constructed a manufacturing plant on his property to produce a mouthwash he had previously invented as well as the new toothpaste (which was then called “Dr. Sheffield’s Crème Angelique Dentifrice”).

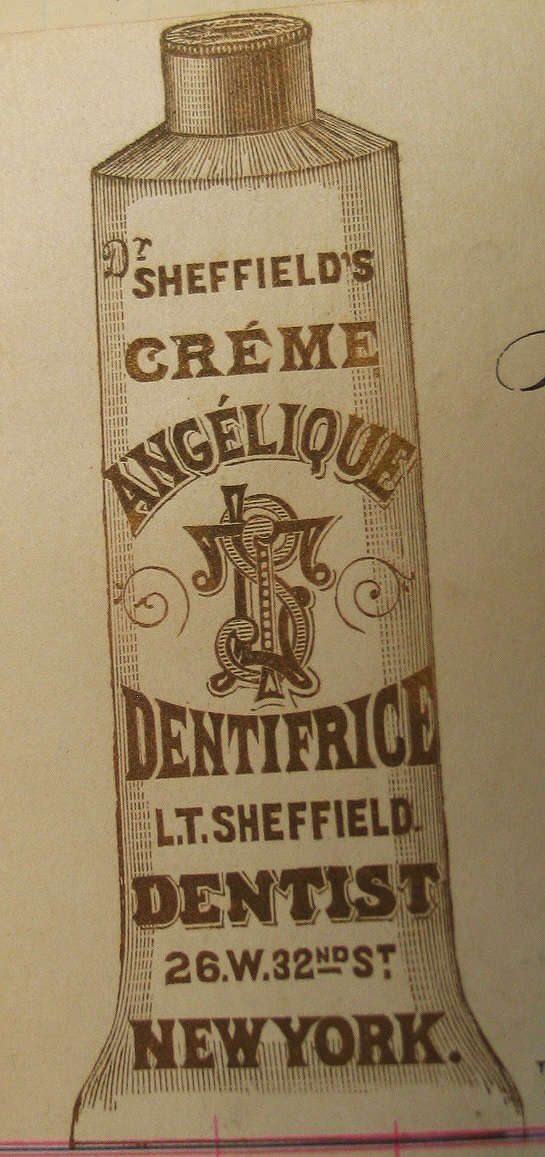
Dr. Sheffield's Crème Angelique Dentifrice

The first advertisement published for Dr. Sheffield's Crème Angelique Dentifrice (the first commercial toothpaste) toothpaste appeared in the New London Telegram on March 12, 1881.

In 1986, the company was purchased by the Faria family, who continued to operate in New London, Connecticut.

Douglas Eger was chairman and CEO of the company from 1992 to 1997, which was then listed on the American stock exchange.

In 2016, Sheffield began distribution in China of its Dr. Sheffield's brand toothpaste.

In 2014, former company President Thomas Faria, who inherited the company upon the death of his father, faced a court case related to polluting and was convicted. He subsequently resigned from and sold the company.

== Overseas competition ==
In 2007, the company reported that it was being undercut by low-cost, counterfeit toothpaste products from China, which were increasingly coming under fire for being tainted with poisonous chemicals. They lobbied Connecticut's state business advocate, Rob Simmons, to ask for increased regulatory oversight into the Chinese and Indonesian imports due to reports of the products being tainted with diethylene glycol, a poisonous substance typically used in antifreeze. The imports were being manufactured with the cheaper, but incorrect, ingredients as a way to illegally undercut the price. Company President Thomas Faria reported that the toothpaste imports were being offered at a cost to retailers of 9 cents a tube, and that he could not even purchase the correct ingredients to make his product at that price.
