= Bisquick =

Betty Crocker pre-mixed baking mix

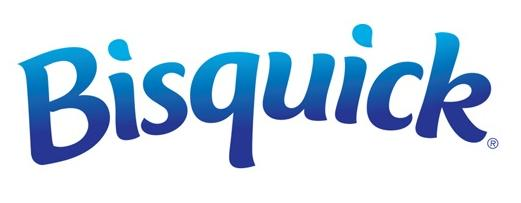
- Type: Baking mix, pancake
- Inventor: Carl Smith
- Inception: 1931; 95 years ago
- Manufacturer: General Mills
- Website: bisquick.com

Bisquick is a baking mix sold by General Mills under its Betty Crocker brand, consisting of flour, shortening, salt, sugar and baking powder (a leavening agent).

== History ==
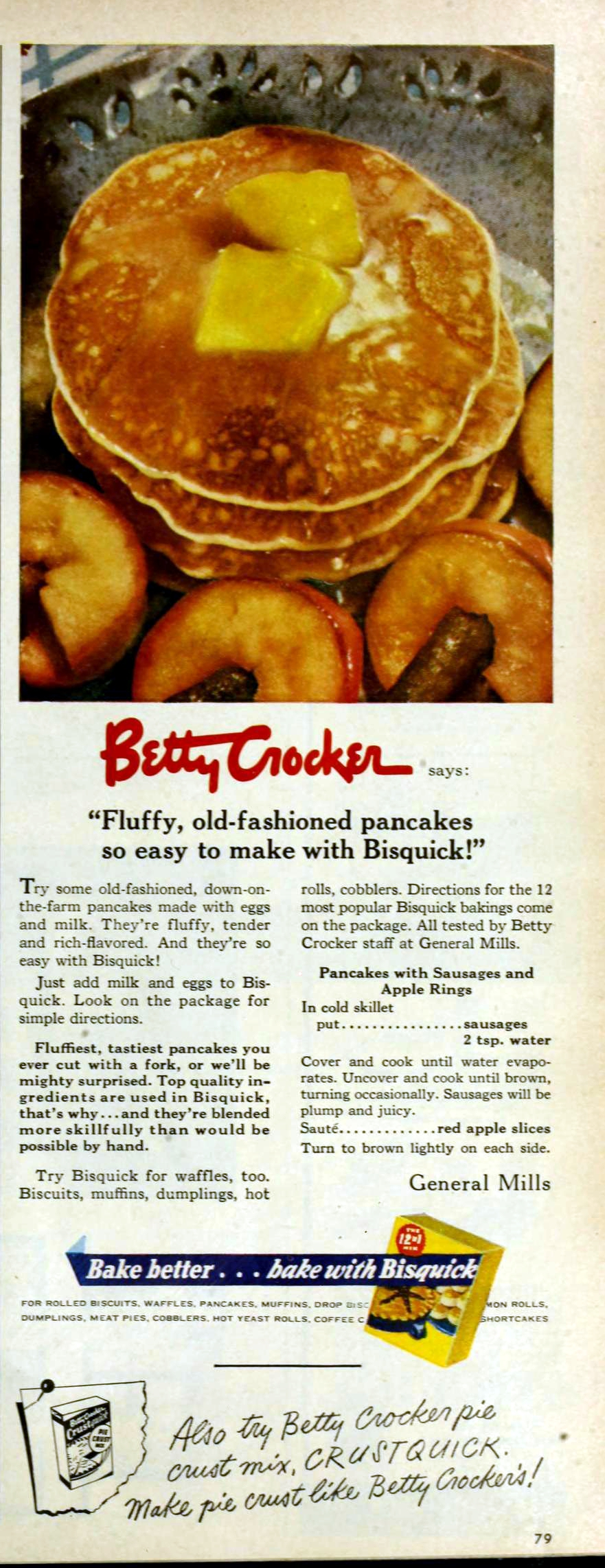
Ad for the product from 1950

According to General Mills, Bisquick was invented in 1930 after one of their top sales executives met an innovative train dining car chef, on a business trip. After the sales executive complimented the chef on his deliciously fresh biscuits, the dining car chef shared that he used a pre-mixed biscuit batter he created consisting of lard, flour, baking powder and salt. The chef then stored this pre-mixed biscuit batter on ice in his kitchen, enabling him to bake fresh biscuits quickly on the train every day. As soon as the sales executive returned from that business trip, he “created” Bisquick.

The recipe was adapted, using hydrogenated oil, thus eliminating the need for refrigeration. Bisquick was officially introduced on grocers' shelves in 1931. More than 500,000 cases of Bisquick were sold during the first several months after its introduction.

Though first promoted for only baking biscuits ("90 seconds from package to oven", the slogan read), Bisquick was soon used to prepare a wide variety of baked goods from pizza dough to pancakes to dumplings to snickerdoodle cookies.

== Substitution ==
1 cup (~240 mL) of Bisquick can be substituted by a mixture of

- 1 cup (~240 mL) of flour,
- 1 1/2 teaspoons of baking powder,
- 1/2 teaspoon of salt, and
- 2 1/2 tablespoons of oil or melted butter (or by cutting in 2 1/2 tbsp Crisco or lard).

== Ingredients ==
The ingredients in Bisquick Original consist of bleached wheat flour (enriched with niacin, iron, thiamine mononitrate, riboflavin and folic acid), corn starch, dextrose, palm oil, leavening (baking soda, sodium aluminum phosphate, monocalcium phosphate), salt, sugar, DATEM, and distilled monoglycerides.

Bisquick Heart Smart is formulated with canola oil resulting in less saturated fat and 0g trans fat. Bisquick also comes in a gluten-free variety, which uses rice flour instead of regular flour.
