= Chicken McNuggets =

Chicken nuggets sold by McDonald's

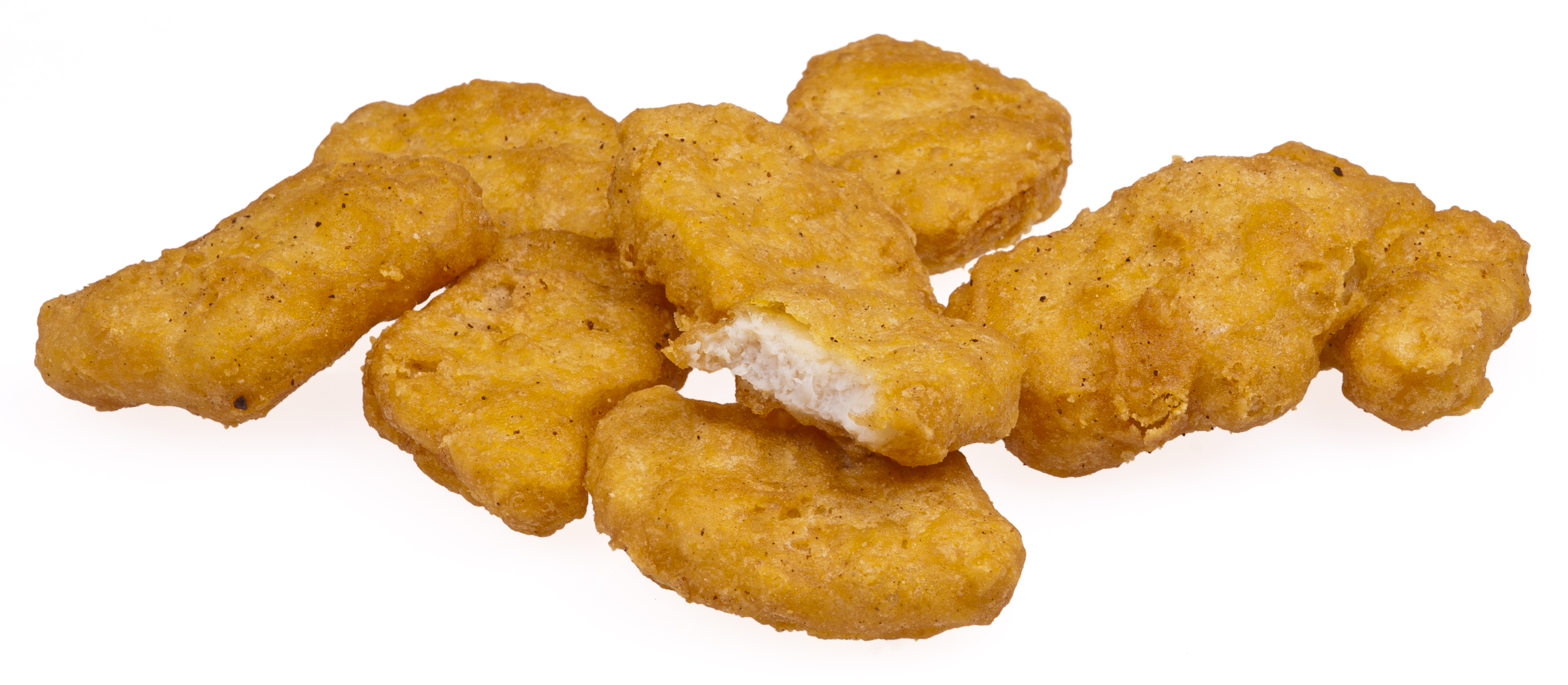

Nutritional value per 10 pieces (162 g) No sauce
- Energy: 440 kcal (1,800 kJ)
- Carbohydrates: 30 g (10%)
- Sugars: 0 g
- Dietary fiber: 2 g
- Fat: 30 g (44%)
- Saturated: 5 g (25%)
- Protein: 22 g
Vitamins and minerals
Vitamins	Quantity %DV^{†}
Vitamin A equiv.	0% 0 μg
Vitamin C	2% 2 mg
Minerals	Quantity %DV^{†}
Calcium	2% 20 mg
Iron	6% 1 mg
Sodium	39% 900 mg
- Other constituents: Quantity
- Energy from fat: 270 kcal (1,100 kJ)
- Cholesterol: 65 mg (22%)
- May vary outside United States
- ^{†}Percentages estimated using US recommendations for adults. Source: McDonald's Meal Builder

Chicken McNuggets are a type of chicken nuggets sold by the international fast food restaurant chain McDonald's. They consist of small pieces of reconstituted boneless chicken meat that have been battered and deep fried. Chicken McNuggets were conceived by Keystone Foods in the late 1970s and introduced in select markets in 1981. Chicken McNuggets were introduced worldwide by 1983 after correcting a supply issue. The formula was changed in 2016 to remove artificial preservatives and improve the nutritional value.

== Description and history ==
The Chicken McNugget is a small piece of processed chicken meat that is fried in batter and flash-frozen at a central manufacturing facility, then shipped out and sold at McDonald's restaurants. It was conceived by Keystone Foods founder Herb Lotman in the late 1970s.

McDonald's first executive chef, René Arend, a native of Luxembourg, created the Chicken McNuggets recipe in 1979. "The McNuggets were so well-received that every franchise wanted them", said Arend in a 2009 interview. "There wasn't a system to supply enough chicken". Supply problems were solved by 1983, and Chicken McNuggets became available nationwide in the United States. In Canada, the national release was in late January 1984.

According to McDonald's, the nuggets come in four shapes: the bell, the bone (or the bow-tie), the ball and the boot. The reason for the four different shapes is to ensure consistent cooking times for food safety. Four shapes were chosen because McDonalds states "The 4 shapes we make Chicken McNuggets in was the perfect equilibrium of dipability and fun. 3 would’ve been too few. 5 would’ve been, like, wacky."

In 2014, as part of McDonald's U.S. "Our Food. Your Questions." transparency campaign, the company released a behind-the-scenes video explaining how Chicken McNuggets are made.

== Ingredients ==
As of August 1, 2016, the ingredients within the United States are as follows: White boneless chicken, water, salt, seasoning (yeast extract, salt, wheat starch, natural flavoring, safflower oil, lemon juice solids, dextrose, citric acid), sodium phosphates. Battered and breaded with water, enriched flour (bleached wheat flour, niacin, reduced iron, thiamine mononitrate, riboflavin, folic acid), yellow corn flour, bleached wheat flour, salt, leavening (baking soda, sodium acid pyrophosphate, sodium aluminum phosphate, monocalcium phosphate, calcium lactate), spices, wheat starch, dextrose, corn starch. Prepared in vegetable oil (canola oil, corn oil, soybean oil, hydrogenated soybean oil) with citric acid as a preservative. McDonald's ingredients can vary outside of the US. In August 2016 McDonald's announced that Chicken McNuggets no longer contained artificial preservatives.

== Sale ==
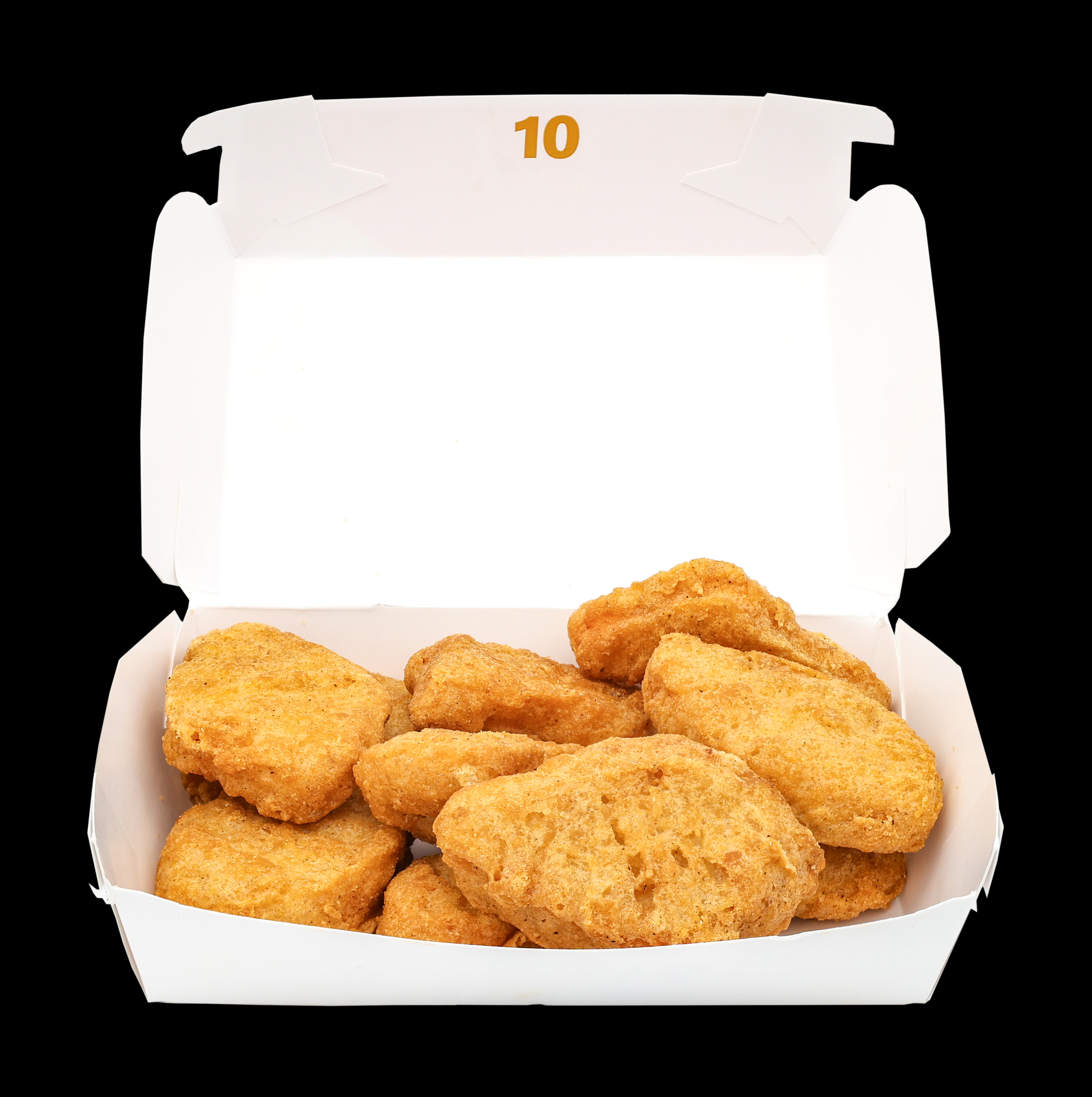
A 10-piece McNugget portion, served in box

Chicken McNuggets are sold in various portion sizes depending on the country of purchase. In the United States, they come in packs of 4, 6, 10, 20 and 50 (in selected stores). In some markets, including the United Kingdom, they are sold in packs of 4 (as part of a Happy Meal), 6, 9 or 20 (as a "ShareBox"). In New Zealand and Australia, they were also available in 3-packs in Happy Meals and Heart Foundation-approved "Tick healthy" meals. In Canada, Chicken McNuggets are sold in packs of 4 (as part of a Happy Meal), 6, 10, and 20. A 50-piece McNuggets meal deal has been promoted at times for special events such as the NFL's Super Bowl.

They have recently been introduced by McDonald's in India, first as a part of its "Breakfast Meal" and later in the regular menu in May 2009. A halal version of the McNuggets has been sold at two franchises in Dearborn, Michigan, beginning in the early 2000s, bringing in double the average sales of regular McNuggets.

== Variants ==
In September 2020, McDonald's introduced Spicy Chicken McNuggets in the United States for a limited time along with Mighty Hot Sauce. Spicy Chicken McNuggets returned, for a limited time, in February 2021, September 2023, and September 2026.

== Criticism ==
In a 2002 lawsuit against McDonald's, a judge commented that Chicken McNuggets are a "McFrankenstein" creation. The judge identified that rather than being merely chicken fried in a pan, McNuggets included elements not utilized by the home cook, including unusual sounding ingredients such as extracts of rosemary, vitamins (niacin, thiamine mononitrate, riboflavin, and folic acid) all of which are common in enriched flour, and leavening (baking soda, calcium lactate, etc.).

The 2004 documentary Super Size Me states that "originally created from old chickens that can no longer lay eggs, McNuggets are now made from chickens with unusually large breasts. They're stripped from the bone, and ground-up into a sort of 'chicken mash', which is then combined with all sorts of stabilizers and preservatives, pressed into familiar shapes, breaded, deep-fried, freeze-dried, and then shipped to a McDonald's near you." Super Size Me also alleged inclusion of ingredients such as TBHQ, polydimethylsiloxane, and others not used by a typical home cook. This was subsequently restated by CNN. Marion Nestle, a New York University professor and author of What to Eat, says that the ingredients in McNuggets probably pose no health risks.

Before August 2016, dimethylpolysiloxane and TBHQ were listed as ingredients in the McNuggets cooking process. According to Lisa McComb, a media relations representative for McDonald's, dimethylpolysiloxane is used as a matter of safety to keep the frying oil from foaming. A review of animal studies by the World Health Organization found no adverse health effects associated with dimethylpolysiloxane. TBHQ is a common preservative for vegetable oils, cereals, nuts, cookies, chips and animal fats, found in other foods such as Girl Scout Cookies and Quaker Chewy Granola Bars. The U.S. Food and Drug Administration sets an upper limit of 0.02% of the oil or fat content in foods, which like other foods, applies to the oil used in McNuggets. Effective use of TBHQ was 1 gram per 5,000 grams of cooking oil (1 gram per 11.023 pounds of cooking oil).

== In culture ==
=== McNugget numbers ===
A mathematical problem, discussed on Eric W. Weisstein's MathWorld and Brady Haran's YouTube channel "Numberphile," is that of determining the greatest number of McNuggets which cannot be made from any combination of pack sizes on offer. For example, in the UK, McNuggets are sold in boxes of 6, 9 or 20 (excluding Happy Meals). Consequently, the greatest number of McNuggets which cannot be purchased exactly is 43, the Frobenius number of the set {6,9,20}. This means that all natural numbers greater than 43 can be expressed, in some way, as the sum of some multiple of each of 6, 9, and 20. For example, 139 = (5 × 20) + (5 × 6) + (1 × 9).

== See also ==
- List of McDonald's products
- McNugget Caviar
