= Ghandi Bread =

Traditional Iranian bread

نان قندی
- Place of origin: Iran

Ghandi Bread or Nan Ghandi (Persian: نان قندی means sugar loaf bread) is a traditional Iranian bread. It is often eaten with tea.

== Recipe ==
- Combine the oil and sugar in a large bowl.
- Add half a cup (60 ml) of water and mix continuously.
- Add the baking powder and ground cardamom and then stir well.
- While stirring, gradually add the flour to the bowl.
- Knead the dough for only a minute or less, just enough to ensure that all the ingredients are well combined. (The dough does not require traditional kneading). Divide the dough into two parts and roll out each portion, into your desired shape.
- Transfer the dough to a well-floured cookie tray.Make small holes in the dough, about one inch apart.
- Brush the surface with beaten egg.
- Sprinkle sesame seeds on the top for decoration.
- Preheat the oven to 204°C (400°F) and bake the Naan Qandi for 20 minutes or until it gets the golden brown color.
