= Leavening agent =

Substance which liberates gas and thereby increases the volume of a dough or batter

In cooking, a leavening agent (/ˈlɛvənɪŋ/) or raising agent, also called a leaven (/ˈlɛvən/) or leavener, is any one of a number of substances used in doughs and batters that cause a foaming action (gas bubbles) that lightens and softens the mixture. An alternative or supplement to leavening agents is mechanical action by which air is incorporated (i.e. kneading). Leavening agents can be biological or synthetic chemical compounds. The gas produced is often carbon dioxide, or occasionally hydrogen.

When a dough or batter is mixed, the starch in the flour and the water in the dough form a matrix (often supported further by proteins like gluten or polysaccharides, such as pentosans or xanthan gum). The starch then gelatinizes and sets, leaving gas bubbles that remain.

== Live leavens ==
=== Direct ===
In direct leavening, purified yeast is added directly to the dough. Usually a baker's yeast is used which is a very fast fermenting strain.

=== Preferments ===
==== Sourdough starter ====
Sourdough starters are made from mixtures of flour and water that is allowed to ferment at room temperature usually for a week or more using natural yeasts and acid forming bacteria found on the wheat and from the local environment. Once formed the starter is maintained by a process of periodically 'feeding' it with flour and water and a portion of it is added as needed to dough to raise the bread.

==== French sponge ====
French sponge (also known as poolish) is a preferment that uses bakers yeast and flour which is fermented for 2–8 hours.

==== Italian sponge ====
Italian sponge (also known as a biga) uses bakers yeast and is prefermented for 12 hours. This results in a more alcoholic smelling dough, and can result in larger holes in the final bread crumb. Biga is typically produced without the addition of salt. It is often used to strengthen dough and improve its structure, and has a complex flavor and enhanced texture due to its long fermentation period.

==== Old dough ====
In old dough, the dough is risen, and then a fraction of the dough is removed and stored for the next loaf. For short periods it is stored in a bowl, for longer periods it is refrigerated.

=== Biological leavening agents ===
- Saccharomyces cerevisiae producing carbon dioxide found in:
  - baker's yeast
  - Beer barm (unpasteurised—live yeast)
  - ginger beer
  - kefir
  - sourdough starter (also contains acid making bacteria)
- Clostridium perfringens producing hydrogen found in salt-rising bread

== Other leavens ==
=== Chemical leavening agents ===
Chemical leavens are mixtures or compounds that release gases when they react with each other, with moisture, or with heat. Most are based on a combination of acid (usually a low molecular weight organic acid) and a salt of bicarbonate (HCO_{3}^{−}). After they act, these compounds leave behind a chemical salt. Chemical leavens are used in quick breads and cakes, as well as cookies and numerous other applications where a long biological fermentation is impractical or undesirable.

=== History ===
Chemical leavening using pearl ash as a leavening agent was mentioned by Amelia Simmons in her American Cookery, published in 1796.

Since chemical expertise is required to create a functional chemical leaven without producing off-flavors from the chemical precursors involved, such substances are often mixed into premeasured combinations for maximum results. These are generally referred to as baking powders. Sour milk and carbonates were used in the 1800s. The breakthrough in chemical leavening agents occurred in the 1930s with the introduction of monocalcium phosphates (Ca(H_{2}PO_{4})_{2}). Other leavening agents developed include sodium aluminium sulfate (NaAl(SO_{4})_{2}·12H_{2}O), disodium pyrophosphate (Na_{2}H_{2}P_{2}O_{7}), and sodium aluminium phosphates (NaH_{14}Al_{3}(PO_{4})_{8}·4H_{2}O and Na_{3}H_{15}Al_{2}(PO_{4})_{8}). These compounds combine with sodium bicarbonate to give carbon dioxide in a predictable manner.

=== Physical leavens ===
Steam and air are used as leavening agents when they expand upon heating. To take advantage of this style of leavening, the baking must be done at high enough temperatures to flash the water to steam, with a batter that is capable of holding the steam in until set. This effect is typically used in products having one large cavity, such as popovers, Yorkshire puddings, pita, and most preparations made from choux pastry. The effect is also seen to a lesser extent in tempura. For making panko the dough is electrically heated, producing steam evenly throughout the dough.

== Mechanical leavening ==
Using a whisk on certain liquids, notably cream or egg whites, can also create foams through mechanical action. This is the method employed in the making of sponge cakes, where an egg protein matrix produced by vigorous whipping provides almost all the structure of the finished product.

The Chorleywood bread process uses a mix of biological and mechanical leavening to produce bread; while it is considered by food processors to be an effective way to deal with the soft wheat flours characteristic of British Isles agriculture, it is controversial due to a perceived lack of quality in the final product. The process has nevertheless been adapted by industrial bakers in other parts of the world.

== See also ==
- Aerated Bread Company, bakeries started in 1862 in the UK that made carbon dioxide leavened bread
- Baking powder
- Chametz
- Parable of the Leaven
- Passover
- Unleavened bread
