= Şefik Süzer =

Turkish physical chemist and professor

- Born: March 19, 1948 (age 78); İncesu, Kayseri, Turkey
- Citizenship: Turkish
- Education: Middle East Technical University; University of California, Berkeley
- Known for: Dynamic and operando X-ray photoelectron spectroscopy
- Awards: Gaede-Langmuir Award (2026); American Vacuum Society Fellow (2010); TÜBİTAK Science Award (1990)
- Scientific career
- Fields: Physical chemistry Surface science X-ray photoelectron spectroscopy
- Workplaces: Middle East Technical University; Bilkent University

Şefik Süzer (born 19 March 1948) is a Turkish physical chemist and professor in the Department of Chemistry at Bilkent University in Ankara, Turkey. His research focuses on surface science and spectroscopy, including dynamic X-ray photoelectron spectroscopy (XPS) for investigating electrical and charge-dynamic processes at material interfaces. He was selected to receive the 2026 Gaede-Langmuir Award of the American Vacuum Society for contributions involving AC and pulsed-bias methods in XPS measurements and the study of local charge dynamics at solid and solid–liquid interfaces.

== Early life and education ==
Süzer was born in İncesu, Kayseri, a district of Kayseri Province in central Turkey. He completed his undergraduate studies in chemistry at Middle East Technical University (METU) in Ankara, graduating with a B.S. in 1970.

He pursued doctoral studies at the University of California, Berkeley, under the supervision of David A. Shirley. He received his Ph.D. in chemistry in 1976.

Süzer undertook postdoctoral research at the University of Sydney in the Department of Theoretical Chemistry under Noel Hush from 1976 to 1977, and at the University of Freiburg in Germany from 1977 to 1978 as an Alexander von Humboldt Fellow.

== Academic career ==
Süzer joined the Chemistry Department of Middle East Technical University in 1978 as an assistant professor, advancing to associate professor in 1981 and full professor in 1988. During this period he also served as a visiting professor at the University of Virginia from 1985 to 1987.

In 1992, he moved to Bilkent University, where he has been a professor of chemistry. He served as chair of the Bilkent Chemistry Department from 1992 to 2007 and again from 2010 to 2020.

== Research ==
Süzer's doctoral and early postdoctoral work addressed questions in atomic physics, including configuration interaction, relativistic contributions, and electron correlation in the photoelectron spectra of heavy elements and rare-earth atoms.

At the University of Virginia, he collaborated with Lester Andrews on matrix isolation infrared spectroscopy of metal–small molecule complexes in noble gas matrices, including alkali-metal complexes of ammonia and water, and radiation-induced chemistry in hydrocarbon matrices.

In 2003, Süzer described differential charging as a potentially useful analytical phenomenon rather than solely an artifact, showing how spatially inhomogeneous charging could be used to distinguish chemically or electrically distinct regions in composite surfaces.

In 2004, he and collaborators reported time-resolved XPS measurements in the millisecond range, using binding-energy shifts following voltage pulses to investigate dielectric relaxation dynamics.

In 2012, Süzer, Hikmet Sezen, and A. A. Rockett reported XPS measurements of a CdS-based photoresistor under working conditions, describing the approach as operando XPS.

Between 2013 and 2016, Süzer collaborated with Coşkun Kocabaş and others on XPS studies of graphene devices. These studies examined voltage drops, doping, substrate interactions, and charge screening in graphene-based structures.

Later work continued to examine operando XPS for liquid and solid interfaces and the dynamics of potential screening at electrified solid–liquid interfaces.

== Awards and honours ==
- 2026 Gaede-Langmuir Award, American Vacuum Society
- 2010 Fellow, American Vacuum Society
- 2007–2008 Fulbright Research Scholarship, University of Delaware
- 2000–2001 Fulbright Research Scholarship, University of Michigan
- 1990 Science Award, Scientific and Technological Research Council of Turkey
- 1977–1978 Alexander von Humboldt Fellowship

== Selected publications ==
- Suzer, S.; Shirley, D. A. (1974). "Initial State Configuration Interaction in the Photoemission Spectrum of Atomic Cd". The Journal of Chemical Physics. 61: 2481. doi:10.1063/1.1682367.
- Suzer, S.; Andrews, L. (1987). "IR Spectra of Alkali Metal–Ammonia Complexes in Solid Argon". Journal of the American Chemical Society. 109: 300. doi:10.1021/ja00235a049.
- Suzer, S. (2003). "Differential Charging in XPS: A Nuisance or a Useful Tool?". Analytical Chemistry. 75: 7026–7029. doi:10.1021/ac030100s.
- Demirok, U. K.; Ertas, G.; Suzer, S. (2004). "Time-resolved XPS in the Millisecond Range". The Journal of Physical Chemistry B. 108: 5179–5181. doi:10.1021/jp049992m.
- Sezen, H.; Suzer, S. (2013). "XPS for Chemical- and Charge-Sensitive Analyses". Thin Solid Films. 534: 1–11. doi:10.1016/j.tsf.2013.02.002.
