= McRib =

Barbecue pork sandwich sold by McDonald's

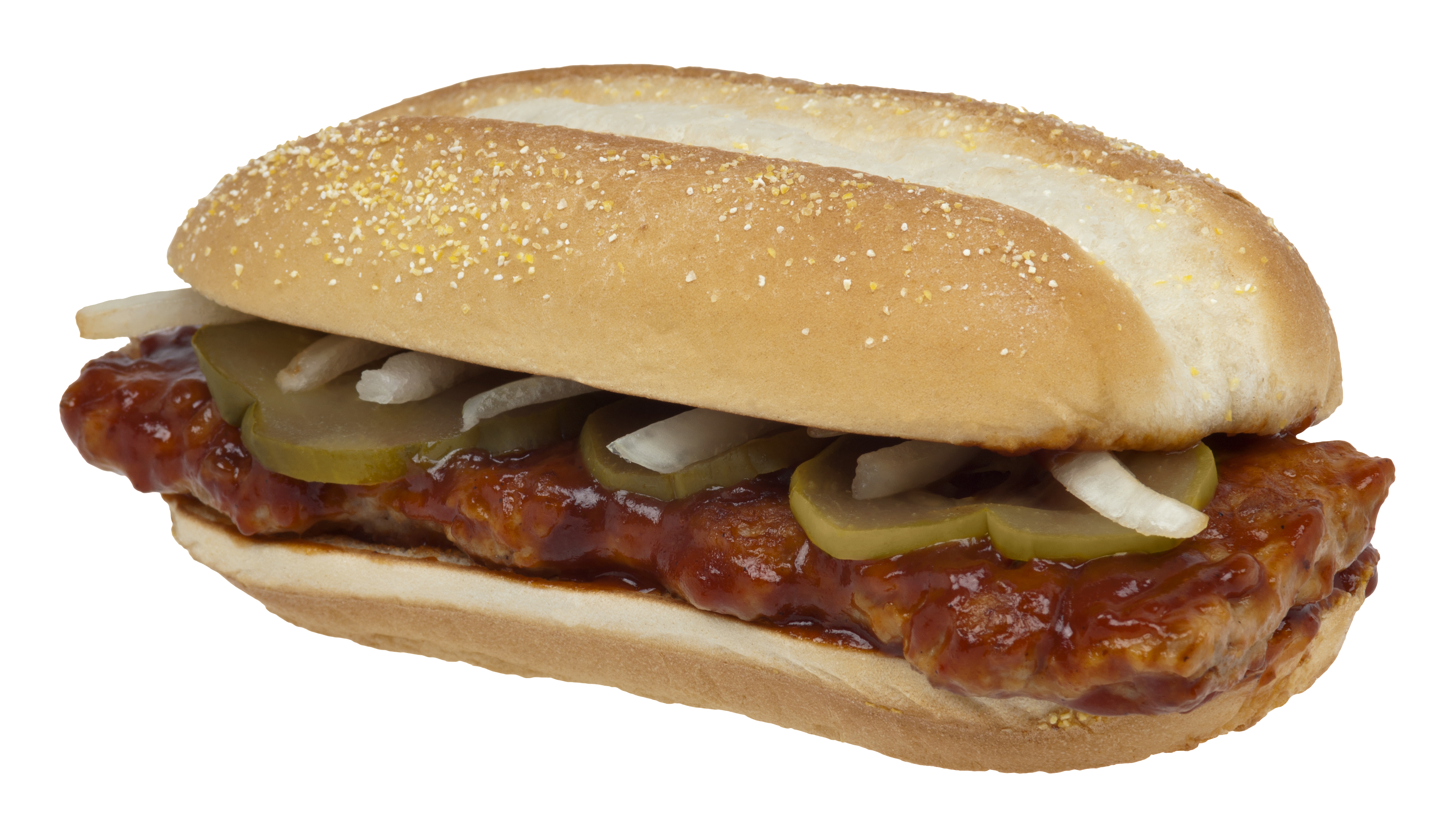

Nutritional value per 1 sandwich, 7.4 ounces (210 grams)
- Energy: 2,008.32 kJ (480.00 kcal)
- Carbohydrates: 45 g (15%)
- Sugars: 12 g
- Dietary fiber: 2 g (10%)
- Fat: 22 g (34%)
- Saturated: 7 g (36%)
- Trans: 0^{†}
- Protein: 27 g
Vitamins and minerals
Vitamins	Quantity %DV^{†}
Vitamin A equiv.	2% 21 μg
Vitamin C	1% 1 mg
Minerals	Quantity %DV^{†}
Calcium	5% 60 mg
Iron	22% 4 mg
Sodium	38% 870 mg
- Other constituents: Quantity
- Energy from fat: 240 kcal (1,000 kJ)
- Cholesterol: 80 mg (27%)
- Ingredients: McRib pork patty, homestyle roll, barbecue sauce, pickle slices, slivered onions
- May vary outside US market.^† No significant measurable trace.
- ^{†}Percentages estimated using US recommendations for adults. Source: https://www.mcdonalds.com/us/en-us/product/mcrib.html

The McRib is a barbecue pork sandwich sold by the American fast food restaurant chain McDonald's, introduced in 1981. It consists of a restructured boneless pork patty (primarily made of pork shoulder) shaped like a miniature rack of ribs, barbecue sauce, onions, and pickles, served as a sandwich on a 5 1/2-inch (14 cm) roll.

After low sales, it was removed from the menu in 1985. It was reintroduced in 1989, staying on the menu until 2005 in many countries. Since 2006, it has generally been made available for a short time each year in most markets where it is sold, typically during the fall season, although it was a permanent menu item at McDonald's restaurants in Germany and Luxembourg until October 27, 2026.

== Product description ==
The McRib consists of a restructured boneless pork patty shaped like a miniature rack of ribs, barbecue sauce, onions, and pickles, served as a sandwich on a 5 1/2-inch (14 cm) roll. Meat restructuring was developed by the US Army to deliver low-cost meat to troops in the field. The process was refined by a Natick Army Labs meat scientist, Dr. Roger Mandigo, leading to the McRib patty. It is primarily composed of ground pork shoulder.

Government doesn't patent their intellectual property, so anyone can use it. They (the Natick Center) presented material at technical meetings...The military allowed us to use the processes they'd developed.
− Roger Mandigo, Natick Center contractor and meat scientist

In an attempt to give pork "the same stature as beef in the institutional market," the National Pork Producers Council funded Mandigo to show how to apply the new technique. Using his roadmap, McDonald's then developed "a patty of pork made from small flakes of meat taken from the shoulders of a pig"

== History ==
=== 1981–2004: Introduction and removal ===
The McRib was first introduced in 1981 as a limited-time offering, initially tested in the Kansas City area. It was developed by McDonald's first executive chef René Arend, a native of Luxembourg who invented Chicken McNuggets in 1979. "The McNuggets were so well received that every franchise wanted them," said Arend in a 2009 interview. "There wasn't a system to supply enough chicken. We had to come up with something to give the other franchises as a new product. So the McRib came about because of the shortage of chickens." It was his inspiration to shape the McRib patty "like a slab of ribs," despite the fact that a round patty would have been cheaper to manufacture and serve on standard hamburger buns.

The McRib Jr. was introduced briefly in 2003 as a mini version of the McRib, placed inside of a hamburger bun.

=== 2005–present: The "Farewell Tour" years and recurring limited releases ===
==== 2005–2009 ====
On November 1, 2005, McDonald's issued a press release announcing that the McRib would be permanently removed from the menu following a "McRib Farewell Tour". McRib.com, a website registered to McDonald's, featured a petition to "Save the McRib", which was facetiously sponsored by the "Boneless Pig Farmers Association of America". On October 16, 2006, the "McRib Farewell Tour II" site appeared.

The McRib reappeared in the United States in October 2007, beginning a third "farewell tour". McDonald's sold 30 million made with over 7 million pounds (3 million kg) of pork in 2007. Its fourth reintroduction was in the end of October 2008, across the United States, Hong Kong, and Japan, with a promotional website featuring music sponsored by a "McRib DJ Plowman" in tribute to its creator.

Additional limited-time regional offerings in various regions of the United States, as well as in Canada, were made throughout 2008 and 2009.

==== 2010–2019 ====
On November 2, 2010, McDonald's began six weeks of US nationwide McRib availability at the Legends of the McRib event in New York City, honoring three superfans: Joey Erwin, a.k.a. Mr. McRib; Alan Klein, founder of the McRib Locator website; and Adam Winer. The promotion ended December 5, 2010. McDonald's credited it with boosting its November 2010 sales by 4.8%. It was the first national offering of the McRib since 1994.

The McRib was offered in Canada from June 21 to August 1, 2011. On October 24, 2011, McDonald's once again made the McRib available for three weeks in a promotion ending November 14.

In celebration of the London Olympics 2012, McDonald's Australia and New Zealand reintroduced the McRib as the Atlanta Pork McRib, as part of an Olympic-themed, limited-edition menu campaign.

For 2012, McDonald's announced that the McRib's annual US release would be delayed until December 17, as opposed to its traditional autumn release (which would instead be used to debut the Cheddar Bacon Onion Angus Burger, or "CBO"). The move was an effort to boost sales during the December period in an attempt to match 2011's abnormally high restaurant-wide sales figures.

The McRib was not released nationally and was sold only in a few cities in a few states in the United States (as the 2005 "McRib Farewell Tour" promotion) in 2013 due to the company introducing several new products (such as the Mighty Wings). The McRib was sold again starting on October 20, 2014, and ending on January 4, 2015, but only in a few cities in a few states in the United States (as the 2006 "McRib Farewell Tour II" promotion).

In November 2014, McDonald's released a promotional video in its "Our Food. Your Questions." series showing how McRib patties are produced, featuring MythBusters co-host Grant Imahara and teacher Wes Bellamy touring Lopez Foods in Oklahoma City.

The McRib made a return in the United Kingdom on December 31, 2014, until February 3, 2015. It was sold again starting in October 2015 and ending in January 2016, but only in a few cities in a few states in the United States (55% of McDonald's locations). It became available again in November 2016, but at a limited number of McDonald's locations, and once more since October 2017, but in most areas. Local McDonald's Twitter accounts announced in Southern California and Hawaii that the McRib would be returning to these locations on November 2 and 9, 2017 respectively. The McRib once again made a limited return in the United States and Australia at participating locations starting in October 2018. It was rolled out once again for a limited time beginning October 7, 2019.

==== 2020–present ====
For 2020, McDonald's announced that the McRib would be made available nationwide in the United States for the first time since 2012, beginning on December 2. It was dubbed as "the most important sandwich of the year." It also returned for a limited run, along with the "El Maco" burger, in Australia.

On September 30, 2021, McDonald's announced on Twitter that the McRib was returning on November 1 for a limited time. It was available at some locations before November 1.

Since 2022, the McRib returned in the US every year since; on October 23, McDonald's announced that the McRib would return on October 31, 2022, for a "McRib Farewell Tour", the fourth such after the 2005 and the 2007 ones; it was available until November 20. Despite the farewell tour promotion, in September 2023, McDonald's announced that the McRib would return in November 2023.

On January 30, 2024, McDonald's McRib sandwiches returned to Canadian locations for the first time since February 2014.

On October 4, 2024, McDonald's announced that the McRib would be available in the United Kingdom for the first time since 2015, with a limited supply.

On November 11, 2025, McDonald's announced the regional return of the McRib—alongside the "Holiday Pie"—in the United States, including cities such as Miami, Dallas, Cleveland, Atlanta, Chicago, Knoxville, Seattle, and Los Angeles, for a limited time.

As of 27 October 2026, the McRib will be withdrawn from the menu in Germany, according to a McDonald's newsletter dated 13 October 2026. In the interim, the McRib 'Sweet Heat' variant will additionally be available until the end."

"According to business journalist Ursula Weidenfeld, the announced discontinuation of the McRib is primarily driven by the EU-wide ban on smoke flavourings, its labour-intensive preparation requiring a separate workstation in the kitchen compared to other products, and below-average sales." "The McRib is regarded as a 'classic' in Germany.

== Lawsuits ==
In November 2011, the Humane Society of the United States filed a complaint with the U.S. Securities and Exchange Commission against the producer of McRib meat, Smithfield Foods, alleging cruel and unusual treatment of the animals used in the McRib patty production. The complaint cites the use of gestation crates and poor and unsanitary living conditions, as well as a lack of proper animal welfare. In 2012, McDonald's announced plans to end the use of gestation crates for breeding pigs in its American supply chain by 2017. By the end of 2024, McDonalds stated the achievement of phasing out the use of gestation stalls for "confirmed pregnant sows" in their "U.S. pork supply."

In early January 2026, The Food Institute reported that a recent class-action lawsuit filed against McDonald's has sparked a broader debate about transparency in how the fast-food giant markets its iconic McRib sandwich. Plaintiffs in the lawsuit argue that McDonald's naming and presentation of the McRib can mislead consumers into expecting premium rib meat when the product is actually made from restructured pork shoulder and other cuts, potentially deceiving customers and prompting questions about marketing practices and transparency in the quick-service restaurant sector. The Food Institute notes that while the legal impact may be minimal, the case highlights ongoing consumer concerns about how limited-time products are advertised and understood by the public.

== Limited availability ==
Speculation on the limited availability of the McRib includes theories concerning the fluctuating price and unreliable supply chains of bulk pork, manipulation of availability windows to turn the product into a better loss leader for the company, and the generation of renewed enthusiasm and higher sales as a result of scarcity.

An informal study from 2011 entitled "A Conspiracy of Hogs: The McRib as Arbitrage" illustrates a correlation between the price of pork and the timing of McDonald's offering the sandwich; all five of the US McRib offerings between 2005 and 2011 occurred during low points in the price of bulk pork.

According to McDonald's, the sandwich's limited availability is due to its desire to provide a varied menu throughout the year.

Country	Availability	Last year available
Germany	Permanent menu item	Oct 27, 2026
Luxembourg	Permanent menu item	Oct 27, 2026
New Zealand	Available periodically as a limited-time offer	2025
Canada	Returned in 2024 after a 10-year hiatus	2024
United Kingdom	Available periodically as a limited-time offer	2024
United States	Available periodically, typically during the fall season	2026
Australia	Available periodically as a limited-time offer	2026
Austria	Available periodically as a limited-time offer	2020
Sweden	Available periodically as a limited-time offer	2020
Japan	Available periodically as a limited-time offer	2019
France	Available periodically as a limited-time offer	2013
Czech Republic	Available periodically as a limited-time offer	2026

== See also ==
- List of sandwiches
- List of McDonald's products
