= René Arend =

Luxembourg-born American chef for McDonald's (1928–2016)

- Born: 30 December 1928; Wiltz, Luxembourg
- Died: August 2016 (aged 87); Naperville, Illinois, U.S.
- Education: College Technique de Strasbourg

René Arend (30 December 1928 – August 2016) was a Luxembourgish-American chef who served as the first executive chef for McDonald's. He is best known for creating several of McDonald's popular menu items, including Chicken McNuggets and the McRib sandwich.

== Early life and career ==
Arend was born in Wiltz, Luxembourg on 30 December 1928, and graduated at the top of his class from the College Technique de Strasbourg in 1952. He began his culinary career at the Continental Hotel in Luxembourg before immigrating to the United States in 1956. He subsequently worked at the luxury Drake Hotel in Chicago, and in 1959, won a gourmet contest with his dish, "supreme de poularde Amphitryon". He later worked as the executive chef at Chicago's Whitehall Club for 14 years.

== Career at McDonald's ==
In 1976, Arend joined McDonald's as its first executive chef, recruited by founder Ray Kroc and CEO Fred L. Turner to expand the menu. Initially, Arend declined Kroc's offer, stating, "I'm a chef, I don't believe in hamburgers." Arend eventually relented and chose to work for McDonald's, stating he was influenced by Kroc's persistence, better hours and benefits, and the opportunity to reach a broader culinary audience.

One of Arend's significant contributions to McDonald's was the development of the Chicken McNugget. Prior to this success, Arend experimented with other chicken-based menu items, including a deep-fried chicken potpie and bone-in fried chicken, neither of which proved commercially viable. Ray Kroc then tasked Arend with developing "onion nuggets", a bite-sized onion ring-like dish. However, Arend pivoted back to chicken at the suggestion of Fred Turner in 1979 and began work on a chicken nugget product. Over the following 14 to 16 months, Arend developed the Chicken McNugget formulation and the initial accompanying sauces: barbecue, sweet and sour, hot mustard, and honey. Subsequently, Bud Sweeney led efforts to optimize the breading, conduct market testing, and establish production technology. McDonald's contracted with Keystone Foods for mechanized chicken processing and Gorton's for batter and coating refinement to facilitate industrial-scale production of Arend's formulation. Test marketing of the Chicken McNugget began in Knoxville, Tennessee, in March 1980, with extremely positive initial sales results that resulted in a chicken supply shortage. After shortages were resolved, McDonald's launched the Chicken McNugget nationwide in 1983, resulting in a rapid increase in McDonald's market share of fast food poultry.

Arend also collaborated with animal science professor Roger Mandigo to create the McRib, which debuted in Kansas City-area McDonald's in 1981, before a nationwide release in 1982. Inspired by pulled pork barbecue he tried in South Carolina, Arend designed the McRib to resemble a rack of ribs, despite being a boneless pork patty. Its creation was, in part, a response to the popularity of the Chicken McNugget and a resulting chicken shortage, along with McDonald's desire for additional menu options.

== Retirement and death ==
Arend retired from full-time work at McDonald's in 1990, and died in Naperville, Illinois in August 2016, at the age of 87.
