= Herb Lotman =

American food industry businessman

- Born: October 9, 1933; Philadelphia, US
- Died: May 8, 2014 (aged 80); Philadelphia, US
- Spouse: Karen Lotman (m. 1957)
- Children: 2

Herb Lotman (October 9, 1933 – May 8, 2014) was a food industry magnate who started out as a truck driver and grew his business, Keystone Foods, to one of the largest worldwide beef and chicken suppliers in the world. He is best known for developing products and processes for McDonald's (including Chicken McNuggets), he was the executive Chef at the time, and for his extensive involvement in charitable and philanthropic activities in Philadelphia and other parts of the United States.

== Personal life ==
Lotman was born in Philadelphia on October 9, 1933, the son of a butcher. Lotman had two children with his wife Karen. He died in Philadelphia at age 80 following complications from heart failure.

== Business career ==
Lotman began his working career in his family's beef wholesale business. He established Keystone Foods, which was instrumental in developing the use of mass-produced frozen burgers in the late 1960s, and supplied these as well as chicken and fish products to McDonald's. In the 1980s he was the inventor of the Chicken McNugget.

Lotman's biggest moment in popular culture came some fifteen years after this, when a scene on the second episode of the HBO television series The Wire (entitled "The Detail") had three characters argue over Lotman's wealth as a result of his creation. They were in dispute over whether the inventor of the Chicken McNugget (unbeknown to them) became extremely wealthy, or received nothing for the invention and is today "working in the basement for regular wage, thinking of some shit to make the fries taste better." The former statement was the one that was incidentally truthful, as Lotman did very well. On the McDonalds website, they call their partnership with Keystone Foods "one of the greatest restaurant success stories in history."

In 1984 over 97% of Keystone's business involved supplying the fast food industry. The business eventually achieved yearly sales of over five billion dollars. Lotman and his business partners sold Keystone to Brazilian company Marfrig in June 2010, in a deal valued at over a billion dollars. Smaller business ventures for Lotman and his wife in his later years included the establishment of the Peppercorn restaurant in the small Pennsylvania town of Wayne in 2013. This closed a few months after his death.

== Philanthropy ==
Lotman was co-founder of the McDonald's Championship on the LPGA Tour, which raised money for Ronald McDonald House Charities and became the largest single golf fundraising event in the world, and a board member of the Children's Cancer Research Foundation. Together with his wife, he also founded the Macula Vision Research Foundation, which aims to find cures for macular degeneration and related illnesses. Throughout his life he was active in fund-raising for a variety of events and organizations, including the Aberdeen Dad Vail Regatta and the Prince Music Theater, which he and his wife had been involved in bringing back into action after its bankruptcy in 2010.
