= Sodium alum =

Inorganic compound

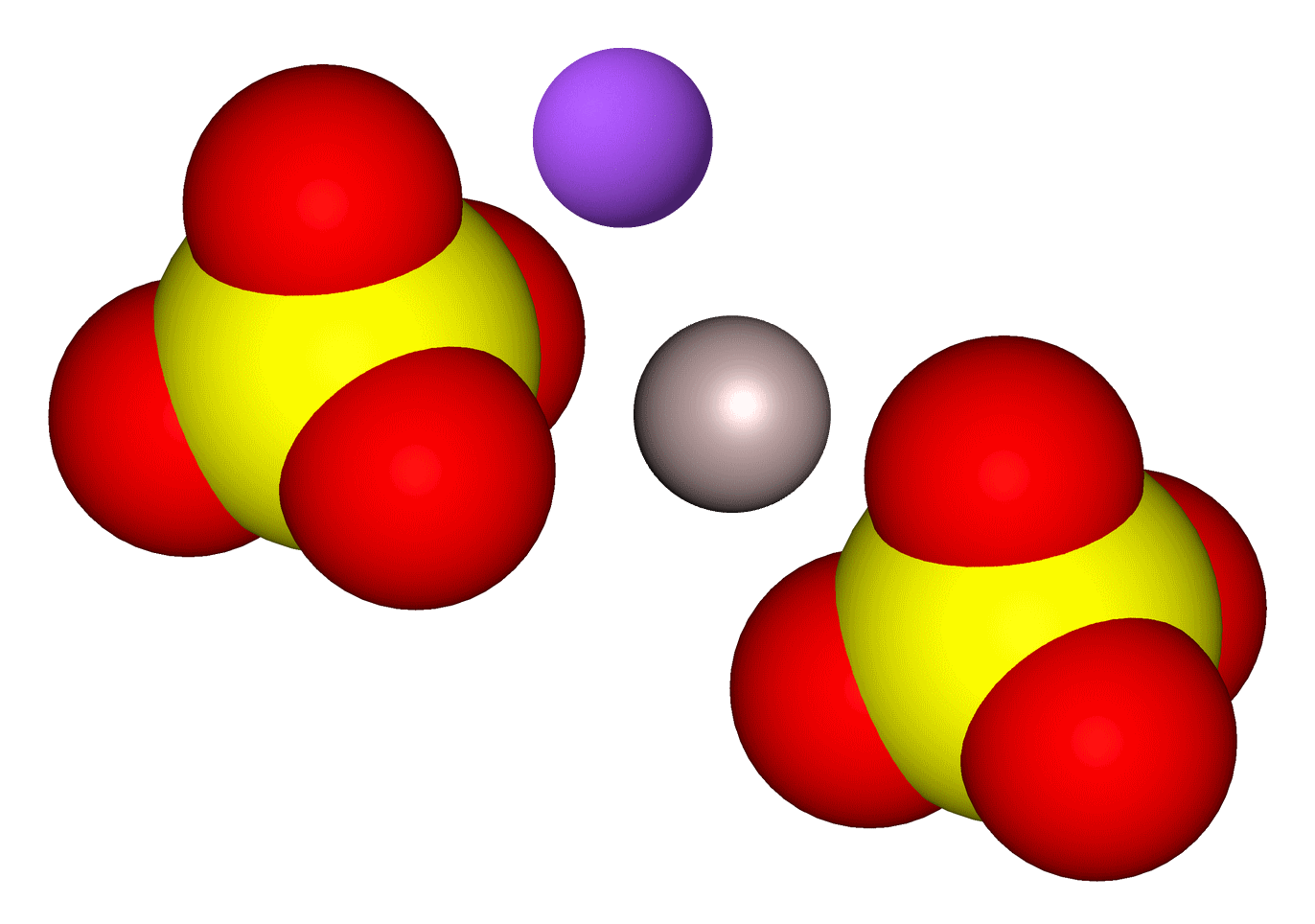

Names
- IUPAC name Aluminium sodium bis(sulfate) – water (1:12)
- Other names: Sodium alum; Soda alum; E521

Identifiers
CAS Number	10102-71-3; 7784-28-3 (dodecahydrate)
3D model (JSmol)	Interactive image
ChemSpider	22972
ECHA InfoCard	100.030.239
EC Number	233-277-3
E number	E521 (acidity regulators, ...)
PubChem CID	24939
UNII	0CM6A697VV; 1224CG79TA (dodecahydrate)
CompTox Dashboard (EPA)	DTXSID60890626
- InChI: InChI=1S/Al.Na.2H2O4S.12H2O/c;;2*1-5(2,3)4;;;;;;;;;;;;/h;;2*(H2,1,2,3,4);12*1H2/q+3;+1;;;;;;;;;;;;;;/p-4 Key: ZEMWIYASLJTEHQ-UHFFFAOYSA-J; InChI=1/Al.Na.2H2O4S.12H2O/c;;2*1-5(2,3)4;;;;;;;;;;;;/h;;2*(H2,1,2,3,4);12*1H2/q+3;+1;;;;;;;;;;;;;;/p-4 Key: ZEMWIYASLJTEHQ-XBHQNQODAL
- SMILES: [O-]S(=O)(=O)[O-].[O-]S(=O)(=O)[O-].[Na+].[Al+3]

Properties
Chemical formula	NaAl(SO_{4})_{2}·12H_{2}O
Molar mass	458.28 g/mol
Appearance	white crystalline powder
Density	1.6754 (20 °C)
Melting point	61 °C (142 °F; 334 K)
Solubility in water	208 g/100 ml (15 °C)
Refractive index (n_{D})	1.4388

Structure
Crystal structure	Cubic, cP96
Space group	Pa3̅, No. 205
Lattice constant	a = 1221.4 pm
Coordination geometry	Octahedral (Na^{+}); Octahedral (Al^{3+})

Hazards
Flash point	non-flammable

Related compounds
Other cations	Ammonium aluminium sulfate Potassium aluminium sulfate
- Except where otherwise noted, data are given for materials in their standard state (at 25 °C [77 °F], 100 kPa). Infobox references

Sodium aluminium sulfate is the inorganic compound with the chemical formula NaAl(SO_{4})_{2}·12H_{2}O (sometimes written Na_{2}SO_{4}·Al_{2}(SO_{4})_{3}·24H_{2}O). Also known as soda alum, sodium alum, or SAS, this white solid is used in the manufacture of baking powder and as a food additive. Its official mineral name is alum-Na (IMA symbol: Aum-Na).

== Properties ==
Like its potassium analog, sodium aluminum sulfate crystallizes as the dodecahydrate in the classical cubic alum structure.

Sodium alum is very soluble in water, and is extremely difficult to purify. In the preparation of this salt, it is preferable to mix the component solutions in the cold, and to evaporate them at a temperature not exceeding 60 °C. 100 parts of water dissolve 110 parts of sodium alum at 0 °C, and 51 parts at 16 °C.

== Production and natural occurrence ==
Sodium aluminum sulfate is produced by combining sodium sulfate and aluminium sulfate. An estimated 3000 ton/y (2003) are produced worldwide.

The dodecahydrate is known in mineralogy as alum-(Na). Two other rare mineral forms are known: mendozite (undecahydrate) and tamarugite (hexahydrate).

== Uses ==
In the US, some brands combine sodium aluminum sulfate with sodium bicarbonate and monocalcium phosphate in formulations of double acting baking powder.

Sodium alum is also used as an acidity regulator in food, with E number E521.

Sodium alum is also a common mordant for the preparation of hematoxylin solutions for staining cell nuclei in histopathology.

It is also used as a flocculant in water treatment and disinfection, but its relatively crude, caustic action makes it more suitable for industrial applications.
