= Bakewell Cream =

American baking powder brand

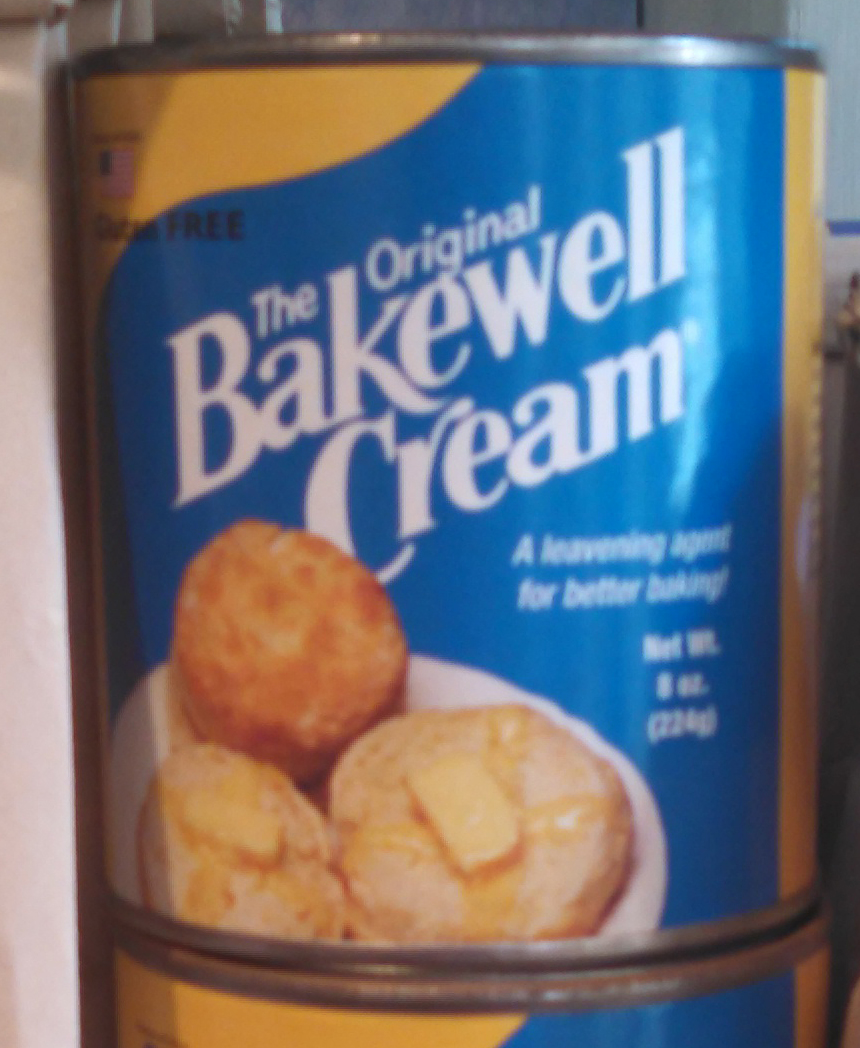
Bakewell Cream baking powder, on a store shelf in Portland, Maine, USA.

Bakewell Cream is a variety of baking powder developed by Bangor, Maine, chemist Byron H. Smith in response to a shortage of cream of tartar in the U.S. during World War II. It is sold throughout the U.S., but is most popular in the state of Maine.

The current manufacturer, the New England Cupboard, is the successor to Byron Smith's original company. Their Bakewell-related products include the original baking powder in several varieties and a biscuit mix, all sold through several channels under the "Bakewell Cream" label. All varieties include acid sodium pyrophosphate, which was Byron Smith's original unique ingredient; those sold as "baking powder" also include sodium bicarbonate.
