= Salt-rising bread =

Style of bacteria-risen bread

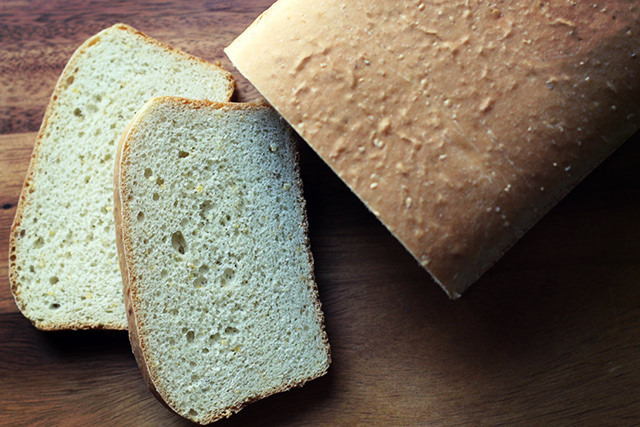
- Alternative names: Salt-risen bread
- Type: Bread
- Region or state: Appalachian Mountains
- Main ingredients: Wheat flour, starter (water or milk; corn, potatoes, or wheat); bacteria (Clostridium perfringens)

Salt-rising (or salt-risen) bread is a dense white bread that is traditional in the Appalachian Mountains, leavened by naturally occurring bacteria rather than by yeast. Salt-rising bread is made from wheat flour; a starter consisting of either water or milk and cornmeal, potatoes, or wheat; and minor ingredients such as salt and sugar. Some common ways of eating salt-rising bread include a slice with sugared coffee poured over it, a grilled cheese sandwich, and the most popular preference, buttered toast.

Salt in the name is a misnomer; the bread is not leavened by salt nor does it taste salty. Nutritional analysis reveals only 20 mg per slice. One explanation for the name of the bread is that the use of salt is often added to the starter to inhibit yeast growth and provide an environment more conducive for the bacteria to grow, enhancing the distinct flavors which predominate over the more typical yeast flavors. Another possible origin of the name may be that the starter was kept warm in a bed of heated salt.

Compared to a sourdough starter, salt-rising bread starter requires a shorter incubation period of 6–16 hours and a higher incubation temperature, of around 40 °C (104 °F). Salt-rising bread is denser, with a closer grain than yeast-leavened bread, which results in a flatter top. Due to the unique fermentation, this bread has a distinctive taste and odor. The pungent odor of the fermenting starter has been described as similar to "very ripe cheese".

== History ==
The exact origin of this bread is still a mystery, but the earliest recipe found for salt-rising bread is a recipe from 1778 from a mountainous region that is now West Virginia but was then the western frontier area of Virginia.

Evidence suggests that it was pioneer women in the Appalachian Mountains who discovered how to make this bread, as there was no yeast available to raise bread in this isolated region, but there is no doubt these women knew about yeast-raised breads. Commercial yeast was unavailable until the 1860s and sourdough cultures would not have survived in such isolated areas prior to refrigeration. Appalachian pioneers in the 1700s were familiar with adding salts, such as potash and saleratus, to their biscuits and cornbread to make them rise. Perhaps they tried a concoction of corn and milk plus salts, allowed it to set in a warm place by their hearth, then made a bread dough, watched it rise, and baked bread.

There are similar fermented breads in a few isolated parts of the world, such as the Greek islands, Cyprus, Turkey, South Africa, and Sudan, that use lentils and chickpeas. The wild fermented breads in Turkey (Karahoyuk bread) and Sudan (Gergoush bread) have traditions that are thousands of years old, yet these breads are fermented by the same wild microbes as in salt-rising bread.

Currently, the tradition of making salt-rising bread is kept alive by relatively few individuals and bakeries that tend to be clustered in the central to eastern United States. It is particularly popular in Kentucky, Ohio, Indiana, West Virginia, Southern Tier of New York, Western Pennsylvania and pockets in Michigan.

== Bacterial fermentation ==
Salt-rising bread and the other similarly fermented breads use the same 3-stage method of production to make bread – starter, sponge, dough. The fermenting microbes in these breads appear to be identical and yield a similar tasting bread, albeit if no additional spices are added to flavor the starter or dough. In the first four hours of fermentation, Bacillus species predominate. Then Clostridium species take over. In the last four hours of fermentation, Lactobacillus species reproduce. One of the main rising agents, Clostridium perfringens, produces mostly hydrogen gas, as opposed to carbon dioxide gas in yeast-raised breads. Hydrogen gas is a lighter gas than carbon dioxide, which explains the dense white crumb. The Clostridium perfringens found in these bacteria-risen breads are considered non-pathogenic, because there is no evidence of any pathogenic toxins produced, nor is there any evidence of the genes to produce such toxins. Thus there is no indication of salt-rising bread having ever caused any human disease. Of course, exposing bread dough to the extreme levels of heat in the baking process would reduce any bacteria to safe levels.
