= McNugget Caviar =

2026 McDonald's food product

Tin of McNugget Caviar

McNugget Caviar is a limited-edition promotional food product that was offered by McDonald's in February 2026 as part of a Valentine's Day marketing campaign. It consisted of a kit containing a one-ounce tin of Baerii sturgeon caviar, labeled "McNugget Caviar," intended to be paired with the chain's Chicken McNuggets. The product was developed in collaboration with Paramount Caviar and was distributed free of charge in limited quantities exclusively through an online registration process.

== Background ==
The concept drew inspiration from a dish served at Coqodaq, a Korean-inspired fried chicken restaurant in New York, during the 2025 U.S. Open. That offering featured six chicken nuggets topped with Petrossian caviar, crème fraîche, and chives, priced at $100 per portion.

McDonald's announced the McNugget Caviar kits on February 2, 2026. In promotional materials they described the pairing as a "match made in heaven" between the contrasting the texture of Chicken McNuggets with the flavor of the caviar. The campaign framed the product as a Valentine's Day-themed offering. Each kit included a 1-ounce tin of Baerii sturgeon caviar, a $25 McDonald's gift card to purchase Chicken McNuggets, crème fraîche, and a mother-of-pearl caviar spoon. The kits were not sold in McDonald's restaurants but were made available exclusively via the website McNuggetCaviar.com. Registration opened at 11:00 a.m. ET on February 10, 2026, and supplies were limited. The product was offered at no cost to participants, though recipients needed to acquire the McNuggets separately using the provided gift card.

== Criticism ==
The promotion drew significant criticism from consumers, primarily centered on the chaotic launch and perceived inaccessibility of the free kits. Many participants reported that the dedicated website crashed almost immediately upon the registration opening at 11:00 a.m. ET on February 10, 2026, with users experiencing blank screens, error messages, or prolonged loading times before the page eventually displayed a "sold out" notice within minutes.

Social media users described the rollout as frustrating and disorganized, with some accusing McDonald's of a "joke" or misleading promotion due to the inability to access the site during the critical window. Complaints included claims that the crash prevented legitimate entries, allowing bots, resellers, or influencers to secure kits, which later appeared on resale platforms like eBay at inflated prices.
