= Mendozite =

Alun mineral formed by oxidation of sulfide in contact with clay

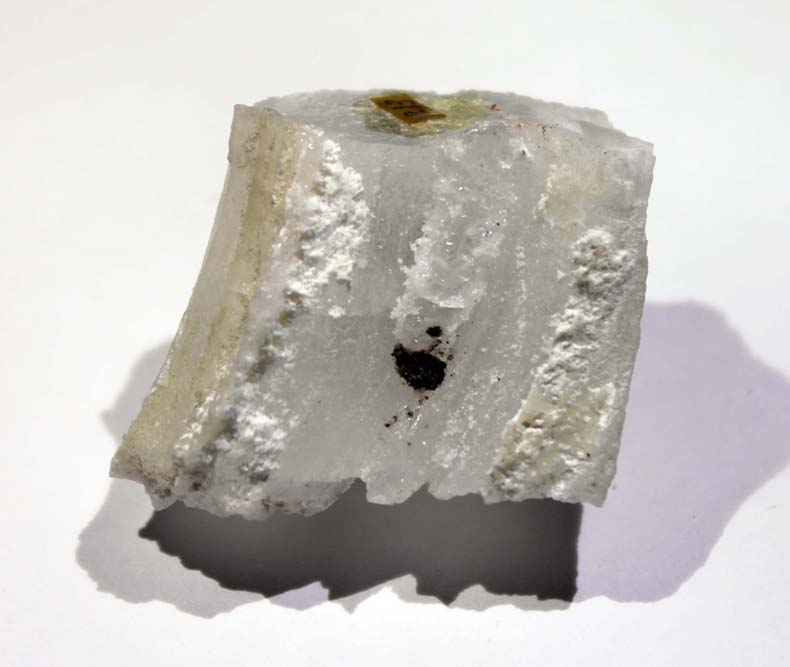

General
- Category: Sulfate minerals, alum series
- Formula: NaAl(SO_{4})_{2}·11H_{2}O
- IMA symbol: Mz
- Strunz classification: 7.CC.15
- Dana classification: 29.5.4.1
- Crystal system: Monoclinic
- Crystal class: Prismatic (2/m) (same H-M symbol)
- Space group: C2/c

Identification
- Formula mass: 440.26 g/mol
- Color: colorless
- Crystal habit: prismatic, pseudo-rhombohedral
- Cleavage: {100} good {001} indistinct {010} indistinct
- Mohs scale hardness: 3
- Luster: vitreous
- Streak: white
- Diaphaneity: transparent to translucent
- Density: 1.74 g/cm^{3}
- Optical properties: biaxial (-)
- Refractive index: n_{α} = 1.449 n_{β} = 1.461 n_{γ} = 1.463
- Birefringence: δ = 0.014
- 2V angle: 56° (measured)
- Solubility: soluble in water
- Alters to: tamarugite

Mendozite is a sulfate mineral, one of the alum series, with formula NaAl(SO_{4})_{2}·11H_{2}O. It is a hydrated form of sodium aluminium sulfate (soda alum).

It was discovered in western Argentina in 1868, probably near San Juan. The exact location has been lost, but was described as "San Juan, near Mendoza", and it is the latter city that give the mineral its name. It occurs in evaporites, presumably from the oxidation of sulfide minerals in the presence of clays. It is very soluble in water, and so can only be found in dry regions: however, in can still effloresce (lose water of crystallisation) in extremely arid climates, altering to tamarugite (the hexahydrate).

== Bibliography ==
- Palache, P.; Berman H.; Frondel, C. (1960). "Dana's System of Mineralogy, Volume II: Halides, Nitrates, Borates, Carbonates, Sulfates, Phosphates, Arsenates, Tungstates, Molybdates, Etc. (Seventh Edition)" John Wiley and Sons, Inc., New York, pp. 469-471.
