= Karahüyük, İncesu =

Karahüyük
- Neighbourhood
- Location in Turkey Karahüyük (Turkey Central Anatolia)
- Coordinates: 38°44′28″N 35°5′24″E
- Country: Turkey
- Province: Kayseri
- District: İncesu
- Population (2022): 149
- Time zone: UTC+3 (TRT)

Karahüyük is a neighbourhood of the municipality and district of İncesu, Kayseri Province, Turkey. Its population is 149 (2022).
