= İncesu, Kayseri =

İncesu
- District and municipality
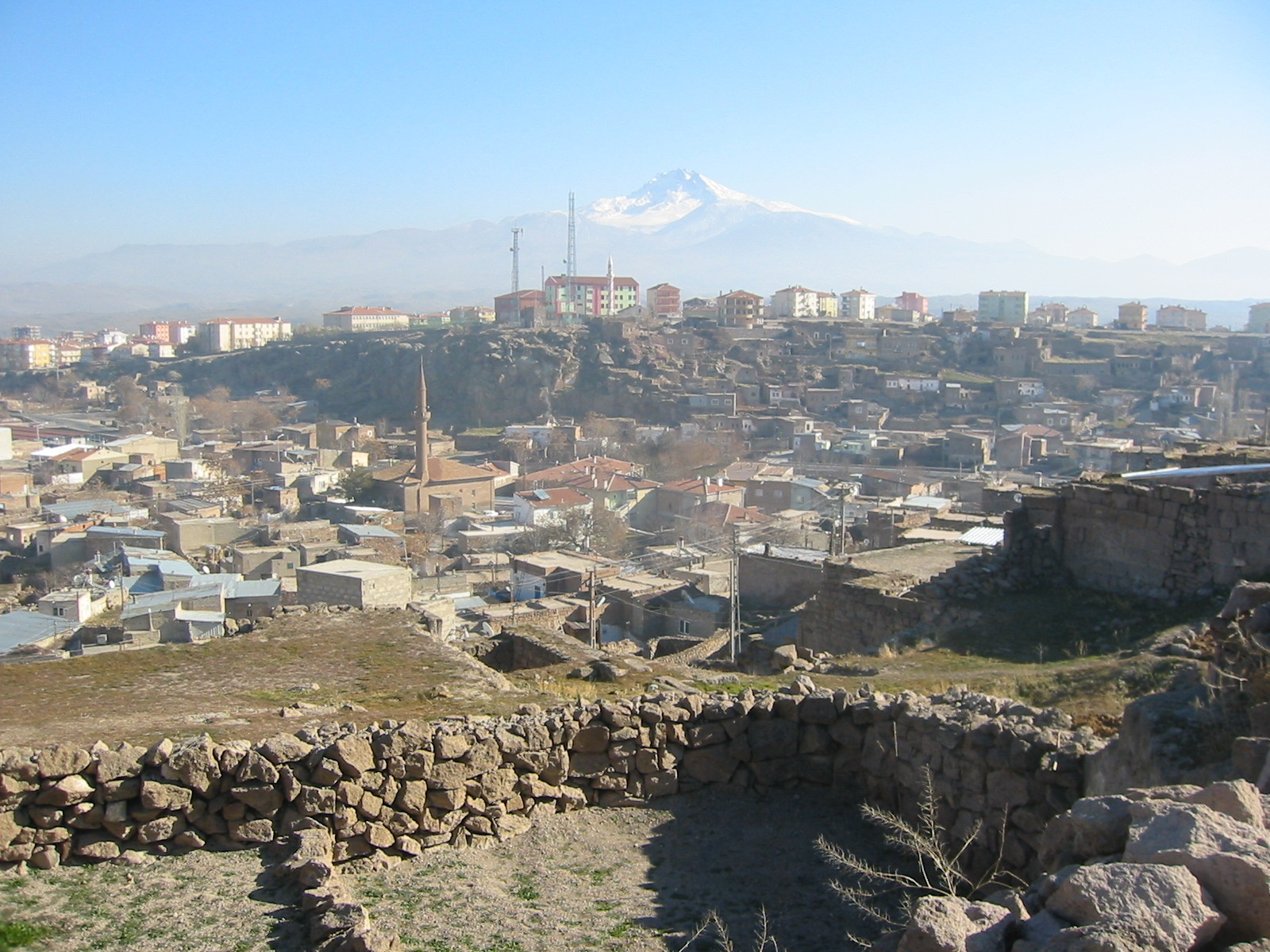

- Map showing İncesu District in Kayseri Province

- Location within Turkey Location within Turkey Central Anatolia
- Coordinates: 38°37′20″N 35°11′05″E
- Country: Turkey
- Province: Kayseri

Government
  - Mayor: Mustafa İlmek (AKP)
- Area: 874 km^{2} (337 sq mi)
- Population (2022): 29,120
  - Density: 33.3/km^{2} (86.3/sq mi)
- Time zone: UTC+3 (TRT)
- Postal code: 38560
- Area code: 0352
- Website: www.incesu.bel.tr

İncesu is a municipality and district of Kayseri Province, Turkey. Its area is 874 km^{2}, and its population is 29,120 (2022). The mayor is Mustafa İlmek (AKP). It has been identified with the ancient town Sadogora or Sadacora.

== History ==
At the beginning of the 20th century, Greeks still formed part of the population of İncesu. Most of them went with the Turkish-Greek Population Exchange. There is the Kara Mustafa Pasha Caravanserai built by Kara Mustafa Pasha in 1660 in İncesu.

In 2021, archaeologists discovered late Roman and early Byzantine houses, with inscriptions and mosaics.

== Composition ==
There are 33 neighbourhoods in İncesu District:

- Bahçelievler
- Bahçesaray
- Bulgurcu
- Çardaklı
- Dokuzpınar
- Fırınönü
- Garipçe
- Gönenkent
- Güney
- Hamurcu
- Karahüyük
- Karakoyunlu
- Karamustafapaşa
- Kızılören Aşağı
- Kızılören Ötebatan
- Kızılören Tabaklı
- Küllü
- Örenşehir
- Orta
- Saraycık
- Sarıkürklü
- Semerkent
- Şeyhşaban
- Subaşı
- Süksün Cumhuriyet
- Süksün Hürriyet
- Süksün Zafer
- Sultansazı
- Tahirinli
- Üçkuyu
- Vali Ihsan Aras
- Yarım
- Yenicami
