= Baking powder =

Dry chemical leavening agent

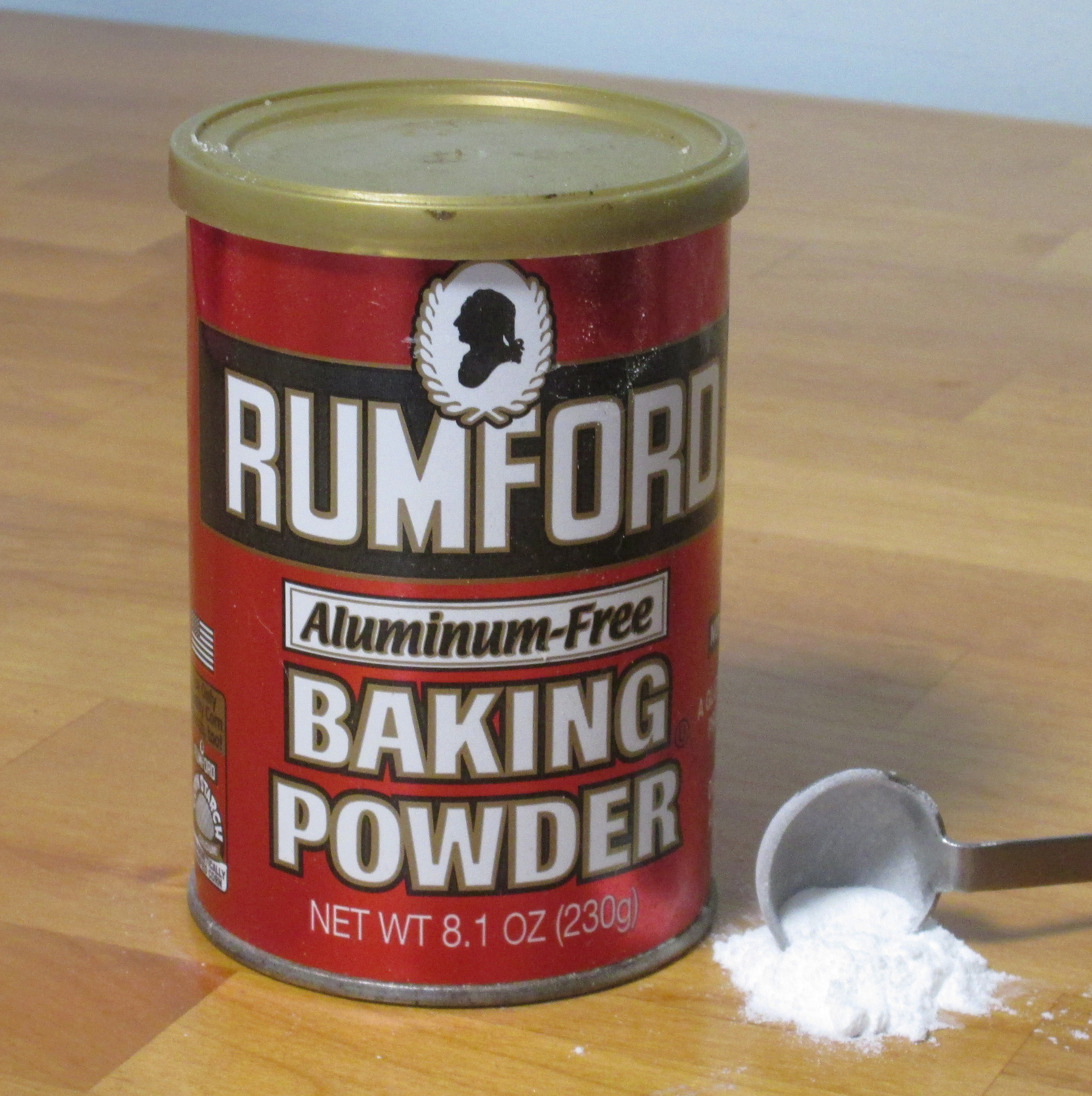
U.S. consumer-packaged baking powder. Rumford baking powder contains monocalcium phosphate, sodium bicarbonate, and cornstarch.

Baking powder is a dry chemical leavening agent, a mixture of a carbonate or bicarbonate and a weak acid. The base and acid are prevented from reacting prematurely by the inclusion of a desiccant such as cornstarch. Baking powder is used to increase the volume and lighten the texture of baked goods. It works by releasing carbon dioxide gas into a batter or dough through an acid–base reaction, causing bubbles in the wet mixture to expand and thus leavening the mixture.

The first commercially sold baking powder ever was Borwick's Baking Powder, launched in England in 1842 by George Borwick, who had spent eleven years from 1831 perfecting a formula passed to him by his father-in-law, a chemist, as a yeast substitute for home baking. The following year, in 1843, pharmacist Alfred Bird developed his own single-acting baking powder (meaning that it releases all of its carbon dioxide as soon as it is dampened). In 1856, Eben Norton Horsford, the Rumford Professor at Harvard University, received an American patent, for monocalcium phosphate, for baking powder. In the 1860s, Horsford developed the first double-acting baking powder, which releases some carbon dioxide when dampened and later releases more of the gas when heated by baking

Baking powder is used instead of yeast for end-products where fermentation flavors would be undesirable, or where the batter lacks the elastic structure to hold gas bubbles for more than a few minutes, and to speed the production of baked goods. Because carbon dioxide is released at a faster rate through the acid–base reaction than through fermentation, breads made by chemical leavening are called quick breads. The introduction of baking powder was revolutionary in minimizing the time and labor required to make breadstuffs. Baking powder led to the creation of new types of cakes, cookies, biscuits, and other baked goods.

== Formulation and mechanism ==
Baking powder is made up of a base, an acid, and a desiccant to prevent the acid and base from reacting before their intended use. Most commercially available baking powders are made up of sodium bicarbonate (NaHCO_{3}, also known as baking soda or bicarbonate of soda) and one or more acid salts.

=== Acid-base reactions ===
When combined with water, the sodium bicarbonate and acid salts react to produce gaseous carbon dioxide. Whether commercially or domestically prepared, the principles behind baking powder formulations remain the same. The acid-base reaction can be generically represented as shown:

NaHCO_{3} + H^{+} → Na^{+} + CO_{2} + H_{2}O

The real reactions are more complicated because the acids are complicated. For example, starting with baking soda and monocalcium phosphate, the reaction produces carbon dioxide by the following stoichiometry:

14 NaHCO_{3} + 5 Ca(H_{2}PO_{4})_{2} → 14 CO_{2} + Ca_{5}(PO_{4})_{3}OH + 7 Na_{2}HPO_{4} + 13 H_{2}O

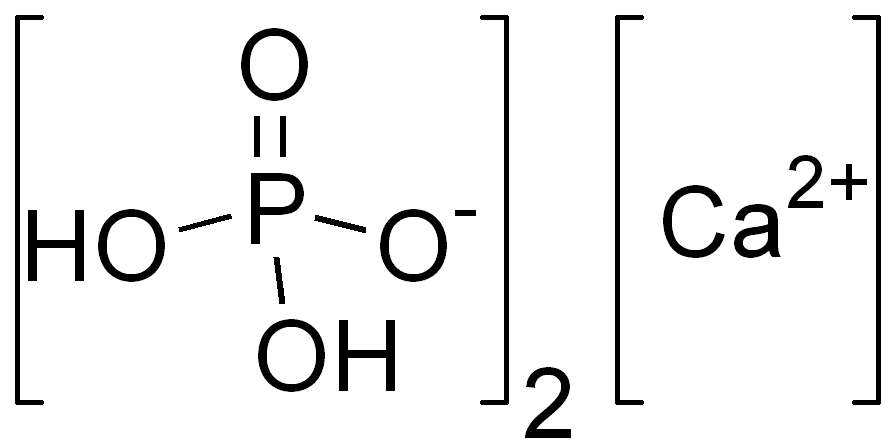
Monocalcium phosphate ("MCP") is a common acid component in domestic baking powders.

A typical formulation (by weight) could call for 30% sodium bicarbonate, 5–12% monocalcium phosphate, and 21–26% sodium aluminium sulfate. Alternately, a commercial baking powder might use sodium acid pyrophosphate as one of the two acidic components instead of sodium aluminium sulfate. Another typical acid in such formulations is cream of tartar (KC_{4}H_{5}O_{6}), a derivative of tartaric acid.

=== Double-acting baking powders ===
The use of two acidic components is the basis of the term "double acting". The acid in a baking powder can be either fast-acting or slow-acting. A fast-acting acid reacts in a wet mixture with baking soda at room temperature, and a slow-acting acid does not react until heated. When the chemical reactions in baking powders involve both fast- and slow-acting acids, they are known as "double-acting"; those that contain only one acid are "single-acting".

By providing a second rise in the oven, double-acting baking powders increase the reliability of baked goods by rendering the time elapsed between mixing and baking less critical. This is the type of baking powder most widely available to consumers today. Double-acting baking powders work in two phases; once when cold, and once when hot.

Thus, a double-acting baking powder, with baking soda, uses fast-acting acid that reacts in a cool (room temperature), wet mixture. Later, after heating, the slower-acting acid reacts, with baking soda, in the wet mixture, at the now-high-temperature. Slower-acting acids only react at higher than room temperatures.

However, Rumford Baking Powder is a double-acting product that contains only one leavening acid, monocalcium phosphate. With this acid, about two-thirds of the available gas is released within about two minutes of mixing at room temperature. It then becomes dormant because an intermediate species, dicalcium phosphate, is generated during the initial mixing. A further release of gas requires the batter to be heated above 140 °F (60 °C).

Common low-temperature acid salts include cream of tartar and monocalcium phosphate (also called calcium acid phosphate). High-temperature acid salts include sodium aluminium sulfate, sodium aluminium phosphate, and sodium acid pyrophosphate.

=== Starch component ===
Baking powders also include components to improve their stability and consistency. Cornstarch, flour, or potato starch are often used as desiccants An inert starch serves several functions in baking powder. Primarily it is used to absorb moisture, and so prolong shelf life of the compound by keeping the powder's alkaline and acidic components dry so as not to react with each other prematurely. A dry powder also flows and mixes more easily. Finally, the added bulk allows for more accurate measurements.

=== Commonly used bases and acids ===
Baking powder is made of two main components: an acid and a bicarbonate base. When they are hydrated, an acid–base reaction occurs, releasing carbon dioxide. Commonly used acids and bases for baking powders are:

==== Bases ====
- Sodium bicarbonate
- Ammonium bicarbonate
- Potassium bicarbonate

==== Acids ====
- Dicalcium phosphate dihydrate (DCPD) 33 neutralizing value
- Glucono delta-lactone (GDL) 45 neutralizing value
- Fumaric acid
- Dimagnesium phosphate (DMP)
- Anhydrous monocalcium phosphate (AMCP) 83 neutralizing value

Acids, Low-temperature

- Potassium acid tartrate (cream of tartar) 45 neutralizing value
- Monocalcium phosphate (MCP) 80 neutralizing value

Acids, High-temperature

- Sodium acid pyrophosphate (SAPP) 72 neutralizing value
- Sodium aluminium phosphate (SALP) 100 neutralizing value
- Sodium aluminium sulfate (SAS) 104 neutralizing value

=== Neutralizing value ===
The neutralizing value (NV) is defined as the amount of baking soda required to neutralize 100 parts of a leavening acid (by weight).

Neutralizing value can be expressed through the following formula:

NV = g of NaHCO_{3} neutralized by 100 g leavening acid

=== Rate of reaction ===
The rate of reaction (ROR) is represented by the percentage of carbon dioxide released by the acid-base reaction.

Other subcategories exist to classify the reaction rated during mixing and holding called “Dough Reaction Rate (DRR)” and during baking at a given temperature denominated “Batter Reaction Rate (BRR)”.

The ROR of baking powders is impacted by many factors, including:

- Acid type: moisture and/or heat reactivity are influenced by its physicochemical properties, such as solubility and dissociation extent.
- Granulometry
- Temperature of dough or batter
- Concentration of leavening acid and base
- Hydration
- Presence of water-binding ingredients (e.g. sugars, alcohols, starches, gums, salt)
- Presence of cations (calcium)

== History ==
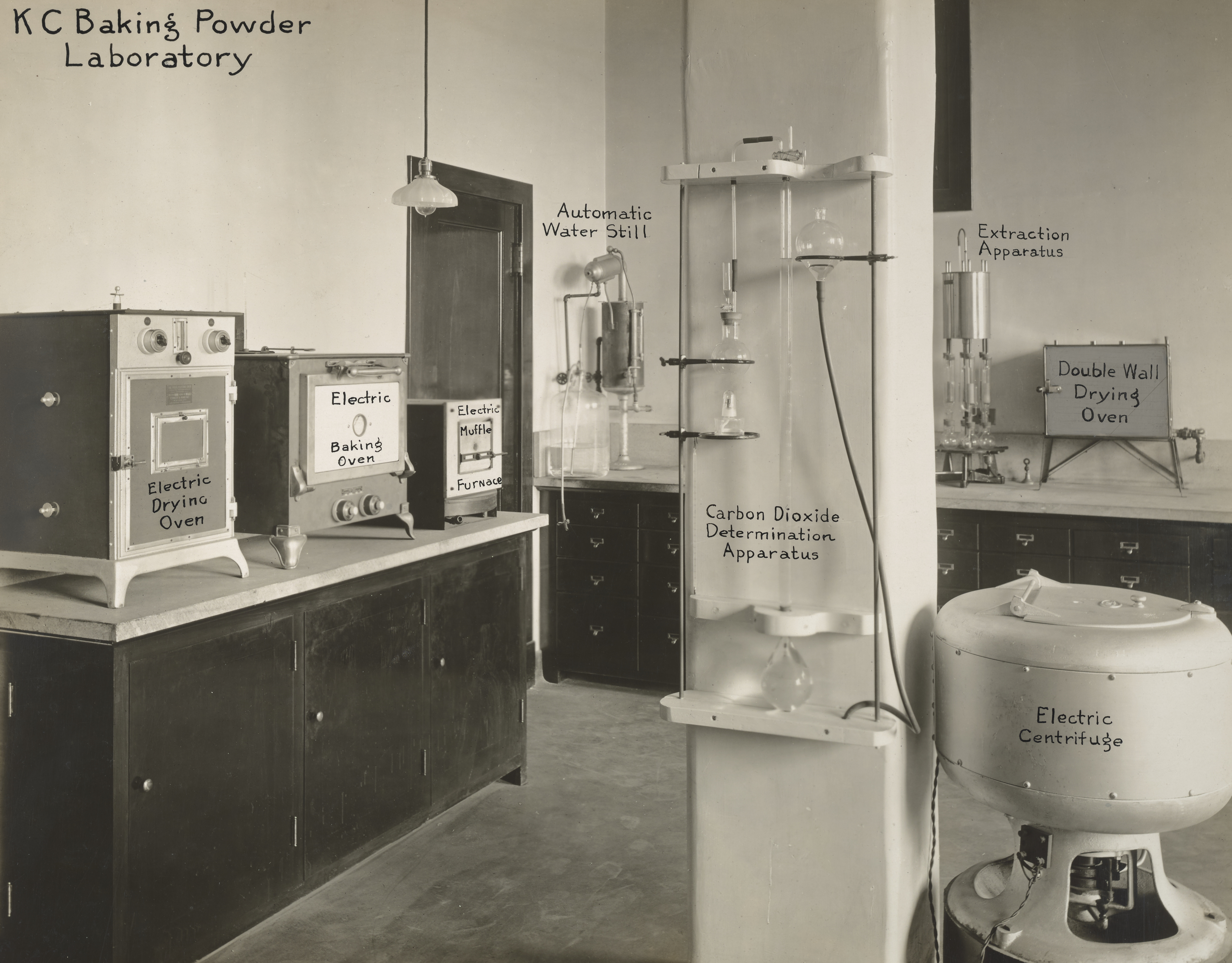
Baking powder laboratory in Chicago, 1918

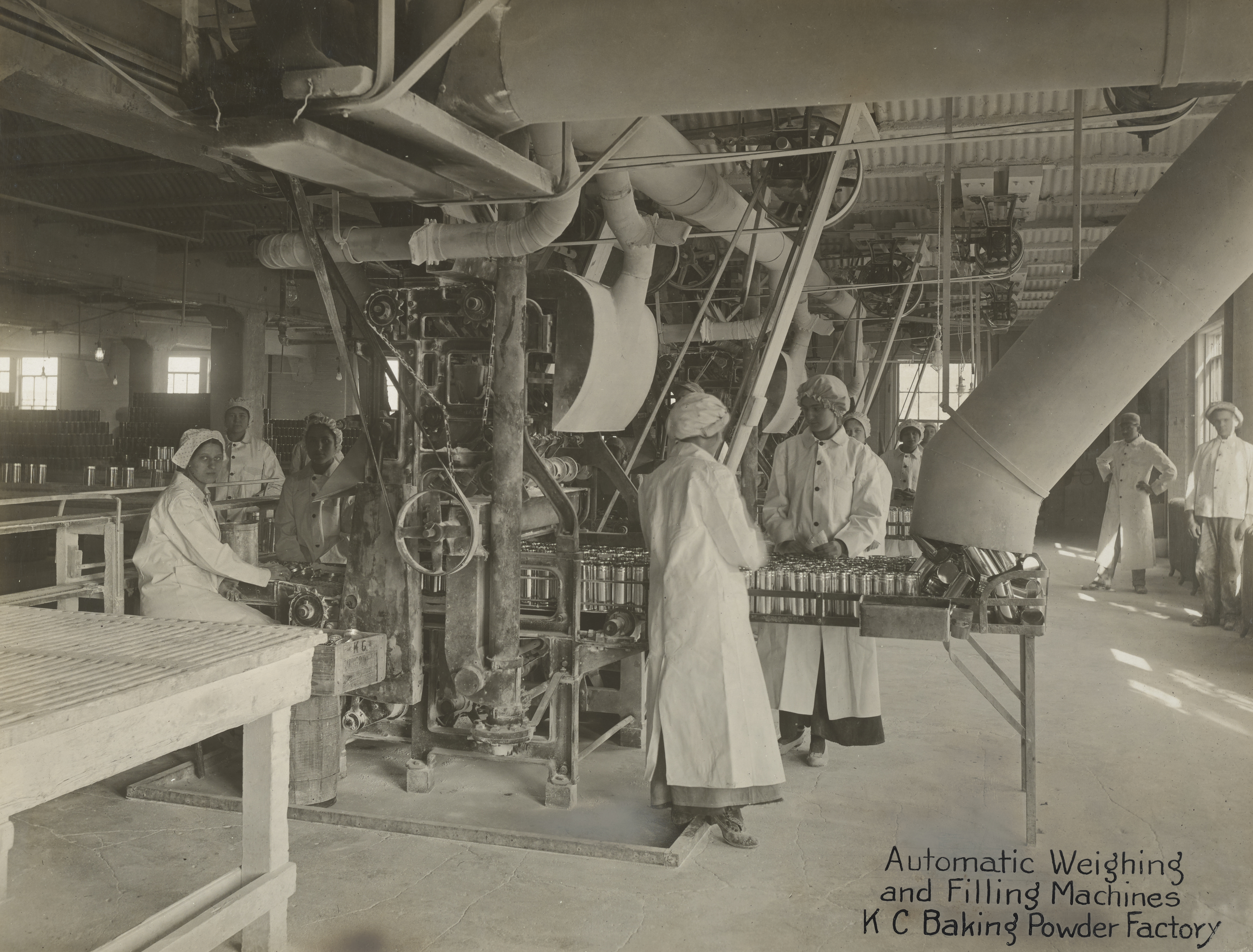
Baking powder filling machine in Chicago, 1918

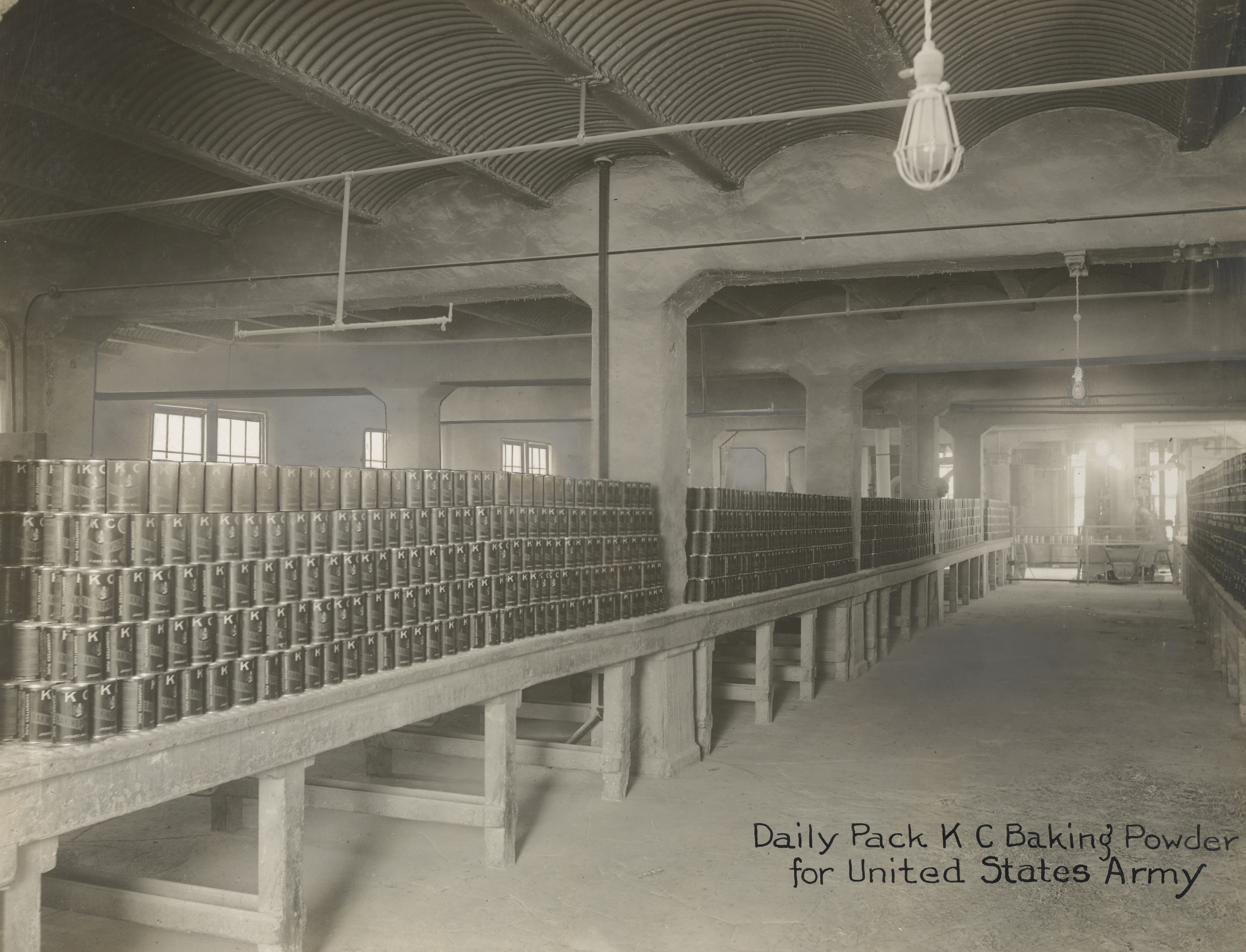
Baking powder awaiting shipment to US Forces in Europe, World War I

=== Before baking powder ===
When Amelia Simmons published American Cookery (1792), the first American cookbook, three known types of leavening were used in its recipes: baker's yeast, emptins (from the leavings of brewer's yeast), and pearlash. At that time, the mechanisms underlying the action of yeasts and other leavenings were not understood, and reliable commercial products were not available. Bakers obtained yeasts from brewers or distillers or made their own by exposing mixtures of flour and water to the open air. If lucky, they could capture useful wild yeast and keep some alive, regularly feeding it for ongoing use and trying to avoid contamination. Women who made their own ale could use the brewing dregs or "emptins" in their baking.

The effectiveness of such leavenings varied widely. Resulting baked goods often had a sour or bitter taste. Breads were made of grain, water, yeast, and sometimes salt. Cooks also made yeast, sponge and pound cakes. Yeast cakes were similar to breads but included fancier ingredients, like sugar, spices, fruits or nuts. Sponge cakes used beaten egg whites for leavening. Pound cakes combined butter, sugar, and flour and eggs, and were particularly dense. Making cakes was even more laborious than making bread: to prepare a cake, a manservant might have to beat the ingredients together as long as an hour.

=== Pearlash ===
The third type of leavening, pearlash, was the precursor to modern baking powder. Pearlash was a purified form of potash. According to Joop Witteveen (1985), pearlash was used in Europe by professional bakers in the mid-seventeenth century. The Oxford English Dictionary credits the first written use of the term "pearl ash" to 1703 and the writing of Abel Boyer.

By the mid-1700s, practical treatises on the calcination of pearlash were available in both England and the United States. Pearlash was the subject of the first patent in the United States, issued in April 1790. Its preparation was time-consuming, but could be accomplished with a cast-iron kettle: it involved soaking fireplace ashes in water to make lye, and then boiling the lye to remove water and obtain "salts".

The active ingredient in pearlash was potassium carbonate (K_{2}CO_{3}). Combining it with an acidic ingredient like sour milk or lemon juice resulted in a chemical reaction that produced carbon dioxide. Once prepared, the white powder was much more stable than yeast. Small amounts could be used on a daily basis, rather than baking a week or two weeks' worth of bread at one time. American Cookery was the first cookbook to call for its use, but by no means the last. With pearlash, cooks were able to create new recipes for new types of cakes, cookies, and biscuits that were quicker and easier to make than yeast-based recipes.

=== Experimentation ===
Between the publication of American Cookery in 1796, and the mid-1800s, cooks experimented with a variety of acids, alkalis, and mineral salts as possible chemical leaveners. Many were already available in households as medicinal, cleaning or solvent products. Smelling salts, hartshorn, and sal volatile were all ammonia inhalants, containing forms of ammonium carbonate. The term "saleratus" was applied confusingly to both potassium bicarbonate and to sodium bicarbonate (NaHCO_{3}, what we now call baking soda). Baking soda and cream of tartar were relatively new ingredients for cooks: Soda may have been introduced to American cooking by female Irish immigrants who found work as kitchen help. Cream of tartar, also known as tartaric acid or potassium bitartrate, was a by-product of wine-making and had to be imported from France and Italy.

In 1846, the first edition of Catherine Beecher's cookbook Domestic Recipe Book (1846) included a recipe for an early prototype of baking powder biscuits that used both baking soda and cream of tartar. Several recipes in the cookbook compiled by Elizabeth Hall Practical American Cookery (1856) used baking soda and cream of tartar to form new types of dough. There were recipes for a "crust" similar to modern dumplings or cobbler, several for cakes, and one for "soda doughnuts". When the third edition of Miss Beecher's Domestic Receipt Book appeared in 1858, it included 8 types of leaveners, only two of which could be made at home.

Baking soda and cream of tartar were sold by chemists rather than in grocery stores. Pharmacists purchased the materials in bulk and then dispensed them individually in small amounts in paper packaging. At least one contributor to Practical American Cookery provided instructions on how to handle baking soda and cream of tartar. Even with instructions, early leaveners could be difficult to obtain, awkward to store, unstandardized, and unpredictable to use.

The chemical leavening effects were accomplished by the activating of a base such as baking soda in the presence of liquid(s) and an acid such as sour milk, vinegar, lemon juice, or cream of tartar. Because these acidulants react with baking soda quickly, retention of gas bubbles was dependent on batter viscosity. It was critical for the batter to be baked quickly, before the gas escaped. The next step, the development of baking powder, created a system where the gas-producing reactions could be delayed until needed.

=== Market history ===
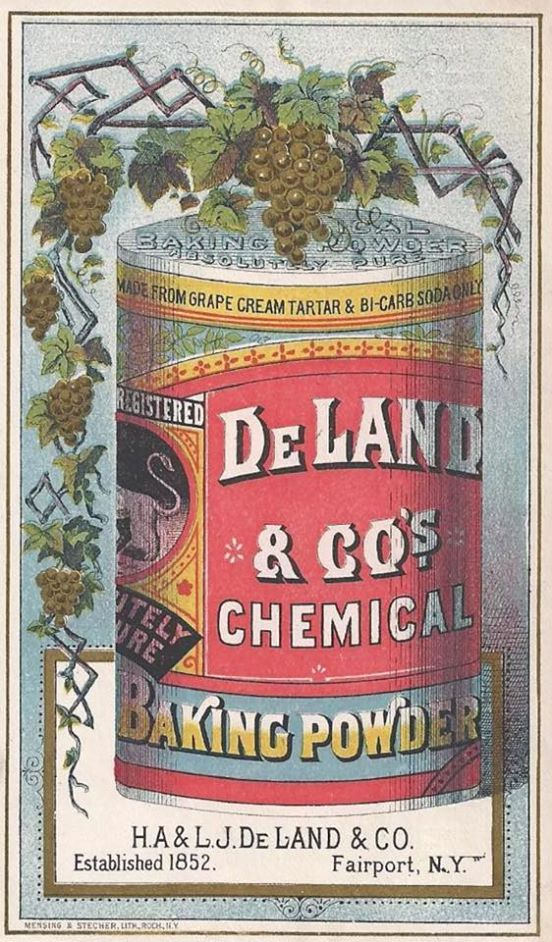
Advertisement for DeLand & Co's Chemical Baking Powder. Earliest possible date: 1877; latest possible date: 1893

The creation of shelf-stable chemical combinations of sodium bicarbonate and cream of tartar is seen as marking the true introduction of baking powder. Although cooks had used both sodium bicarbonate and cream of tartar in recipes, they had to purchase the ingredients individually and store them separately to prevent them from spoiling or reacting prematurely. As chemists developed more uniform constituents, they also began to experiment with ways of combining them. In the mid-late 1800s, chemists introduced the first modern baking powders.

==== Borwick's ====
The earliest baking powder sold commercially was Borwick's Baking Powder, launched in England in 1842 by George Borwick. Borwick had spent eleven years from 1831 refining a formula passed to him by his father-in-law, a chemist, as a yeast substitute for household baking. First sold through chemists and grocers in penny packets as "Borwick's German Baking Powder", by 1896 it claimed to sell six hundred thousand packets each week. The brand remains on sale today and continues to carry the words "Since 1842" on its packaging.

==== Alfred Bird ====
In 1843, English chemist and food manufacturer Alfred Bird developed his own form of baking powder. Bird was motivated to develop a yeast-free leavener because his wife Elizabeth was allergic to eggs and yeast. His formulation included bicarbonate of soda and tartaric acid, mixed with starch to absorb moisture and prevent the other ingredients from reacting. A single-action form of baking powder, Bird's Fermenting Powder, a baking powder, later, Alfred Bird's Baking Powder, reacted as soon as it became damp.

Bird focused on selling his baking powder to the British Army during the Crimean War, and to explorers like Captain Sir Francis Leopold McClintock, rather than the domestic market.

Nonetheless, Bird's creation of baking powder enabled cooks to take recipes for cakes such as the patriotically named Victoria sponge and make them rise higher.

He did not patent his discovery, and others such as Henry Jones of Bristol soon produced and patented similar products. In 1845, Jones patented "A new preparation of flour" (self-raising flour) that included sodium bicarbonate and tartaric acid to obtain a leavening effect.

==== Eben Norton Horsford ====
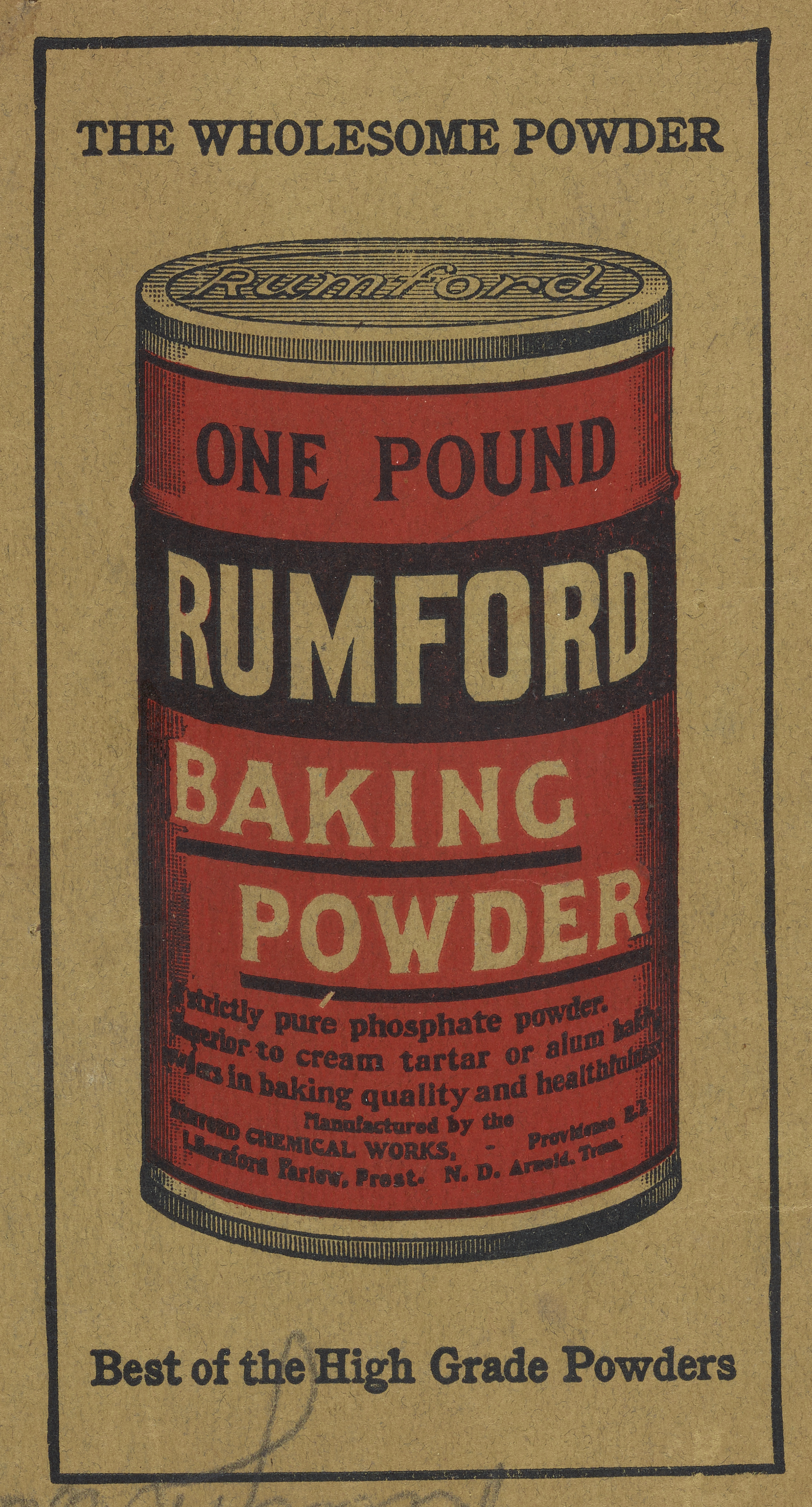
The Rumford Cook Book, 1910, back cover

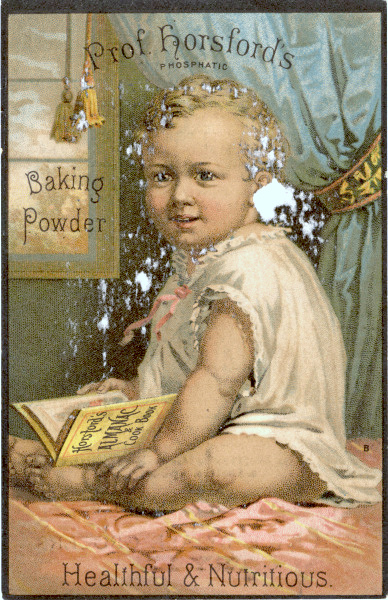
Prof. Horsford's Phosphatic Baking Powder, c. 1900

In America, Eben Norton Horsford, a student of Justus von Liebig, set out to create a flour fortifier and leavening agent. In 1856, he was awarded a patent for "pulverulent phosphoric acid", a process for extracting monocalcium pyrophosphate extracted from bones. Horsford's use of monocalcium pyrophosphate eliminated the need for cream of tartar, which was expensively imported from France and required separate storage.

Combined with baking soda, monocalcium pyrophosphate provided a double-acting form of leavening. Its initial reaction, when exposed to water, released carbon dioxide and produced dicalcium phosphate, which then reacted under heat to release second-stage carbon dioxide.

In 1859, Horsford, the Rumford Professor and Lecturer on the Application of Science to the Useful Arts at Harvard, and George Wilson formed the Rumford Chemical Works, named in honor of Count Rumford (Benjamin Thompson). In 1861, Horsford published The theory and art of breadmaking: A new process without the use of ferment, describing his innovations. In 1864, he obtained a patent for a self-rising flour or "Bread preparation" in which calcium acid phosphate and sodium bicarbonate acted as a leavener.

Horsford's research was interrupted by the American Civil War, but in 1869 Horsford finally created an already-mixed leavening agent by using cornstarch as a desiccant. Rumford Chemical Works then began the manufacture of what can be considered a true baking powder. Throughout his career, Horsford continued to experiment extensively with possible techniques and preparations for baking powder. Horsford's leavening products were marketed originally as "Horsford's Yeast Powder" and later as "Rumford Baking Powder". They were packaged in glass bottles and later in metal cans. In 2006 the Rumford Chemical Works in East Providence, Rhode Island were designated a National Historic Chemical Landmark in recognition of baking powder's impact in making baking easier, quicker, and more reliable.

In the 1860s, Horsford shared his formula for baking powder with his former teacher, Justus von Liebig, who in turn shared it with Ludwig Clamor Marquart and Carl Zimmer in Germany. Baking powders based on Horsford's formula were sold in England as "Horsford-Liebig Baking Powder". They were also sold by several companies in Germany, beginning with Marquart and with Zimmer. However, baking powder was not successful in Germany at that time. Much of German baking occurred in guild-based bakeries, rather than in private homes, and the guilds were not interested in replacing centuries-old craft skills with a new technology. Nonetheless, Liebig clearly saw the importance of Horsford's work, stating:

The preparation of baking powder by Professor Horsford in Cambridge in North America, I consider one of the most important and beneficial discoveries that has been made in the last decade.

— Justus von Liebig

==== Dr. Oetker's Baking Powder ====
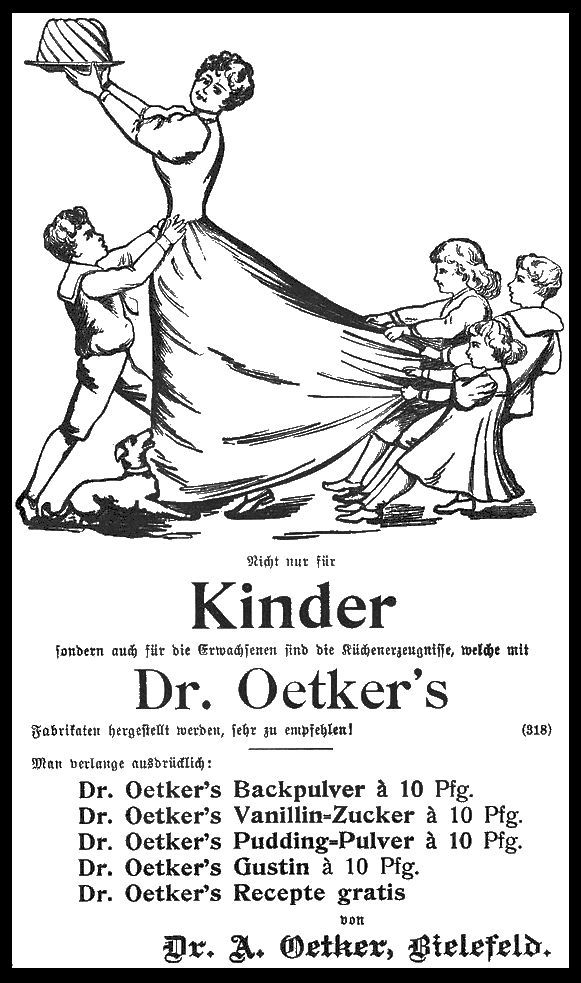
German advertisement for Dr. Oetker's baking powder in 1903

In the 1890s, the German pharmacist August Oetker began to market a baking powder directly to housewives. It became popular in Germany as "Dr. Oetker's Baking Powder" and as "Backin". Oetker started the mass production of phosphate-based baking powder in 1898 and patented his technique in 1903.

Research by Paul R. Jones in 1993 has shown that Oetker's original recipe was a descendant of Horsford's phosphate-based recipe, obtained from Louis Marquand, a son of Ludwig Clamor Marquart. Dr. Oetker Baking Powder continues to be sold, currently listing its ingredients as sodium acid pyrophosphate, sodium bicarbonate and corn starch.

==== Royal Baking Powder ====
In the U.S., in 1866, Joseph C. Hoagland and his brother Cornelius developed a baking powder product with the help of Thomas M. Biddle. They sold a single-action baking powder containing cream of tartar, bicarbonate of soda and starch. Their formula became known as Royal Baking Powder.

Initially in partnership as Biddle & Hoagland, the Hoaglands moved from Fort Wayne, Indiana, to Chicago, leaving Biddle behind, and then to New York. They incorporated there as the Royal Baking Powder Company in 1868. Various battles for control ensued between the Hoagland brothers and their one-time employee William Ziegler. Finally, on March 2, 1899, Ziegler established the New Jersey–based Royal Baking Powder Corporation which combined the three major cream of tartar baking powder companies then in existence in the United States: Dr. Price (Ziegler), Royal (Joseph Hoagland) and Cleveland (Cornelius Nevius Hoagland).

==== Alum-based baking powders ====
Cream of tartar was an expensive ingredient in the United States, since it had to be imported from France. In the 1880s, several companies developed double-action baking powders containing cheaper alternative acids known as alums, a class of compounds involving double sulfates of aluminium. The use of various types of alum in medicines and dyes is mentioned in Pliny the Elder's Natural History. However, the actual composition of alum was not determined until 1798, when Louis Vauquelin demonstrated that common alum is a double salt, composed of sulfuric acid, alumina, and potash. and Jean-Antoine Chaptal published the analysis of four different kinds of alum.

In 1888, William Monroe Wright (a former salesman for Dr. Price) and George Campbell Rew in Chicago introduced a new form of baking powder, which they called Calumet. Calumet Baking Powder contained baking soda, a cornstarch desiccant, sodium aluminium sulfate (NaAl(SO_{4})_{2}·12H_{2}O) as a leavening agent, and albumen. In 1899, after years of experimentation with various possible formulae beginning in the 1870s, Herman Hulman of Terre Haute also introduced a baking powder made with sodium aluminium sulfate. He called his baking powder Clabber, referencing a German baking tradition in which soured milk was used for leavening.

==== Cream of tartar vs. alum ====
Sodium aluminium sulfate baking powders were double-acting, and much less expensive to produce than cream of tartar-based baking powders. Cooks also needed less alum-based baking powder to produce a comparable effect. As a result, alum-based baking powders were severe competition for Royal Baking Powder's cream of tartar-based products. William Ziegler of the Royal Baking Powder Company used a variety of tactics, ranging from false advertising and industrial espionage to bribery, to try to convince consumers and legislators that aluminium-based baking powders were harmful. He suggested (without actual evidence) that alum was unnatural and poisonous, while cream of tartar was natural and healthful. He attempted (and in Missouri briefly succeeded) in convincing legislators to ban aluminium compounds from use in baking powders. At the same time, he changed his own "Dr. Price" baking powder to an aluminium-based formula that cornered two-thirds of the baking powder market in the southern states. Eventually, after a number of legal and commercial battles that included bribery charges against Ziegler and a grand jury hearing, Royal lost the baking powder wars.

The idea that aluminium in baking powder is dangerous can be traced to Ziegler's attack advertising, and has little if any scientific support. Aluminium is a commonly-found metal that appears in trace quantities in most foods. By the 1970s Royal had ceased to produce a cream of tartar baking powder. For those who wanted something similar, James Beard suggested combining two parts cream of tartar to one part baking soda just before using it, since the mixture would not keep. Instead of cream of tartar, modern Royal baking powder contains a mixture of Hulman's sodium aluminium sulfate and Horsford's monocalcium phosphate.

==== Bakewell Baking Powder ====
One more type of baking powder was introduced during World War II under the brand name Bakewell. Faced with wartime shortages of cream of tartar and baking powder, Byron H. Smith, a U.S. inventor in Bangor, Maine, created substitute products for American housewives. Bakewell Cream was introduced as a replacement for cream of tartar. It contained sodium acid pyrophosphate and cornstarch and was labeled as a leavening agent. It could be substituted for cream of tartar or mixed with baking soda to replace baking powder.

Smith also sold a baking powder replacement, in which sodium acid pyrophosphate was already mixed with bicarbonate of soda and cornstarch. Somewhat confusingly, it was marketed as "Bakewell Baking Powder" or "Bakewell Cream Baking Powder". Some packaging uses the phrase "The Original Bakewell Cream". A product labelled "Bakewell Cream" may be either the cream of tartar substitute or the baking powder substitute depending on whether it is additionally identified as "Double acting" "Baking Powder". A modern version containing acid sodium pyrophosphate, sodium bicarbonate and redried starch, is sold as being both aluminium-free and gluten-free.

==== Original preparations ====
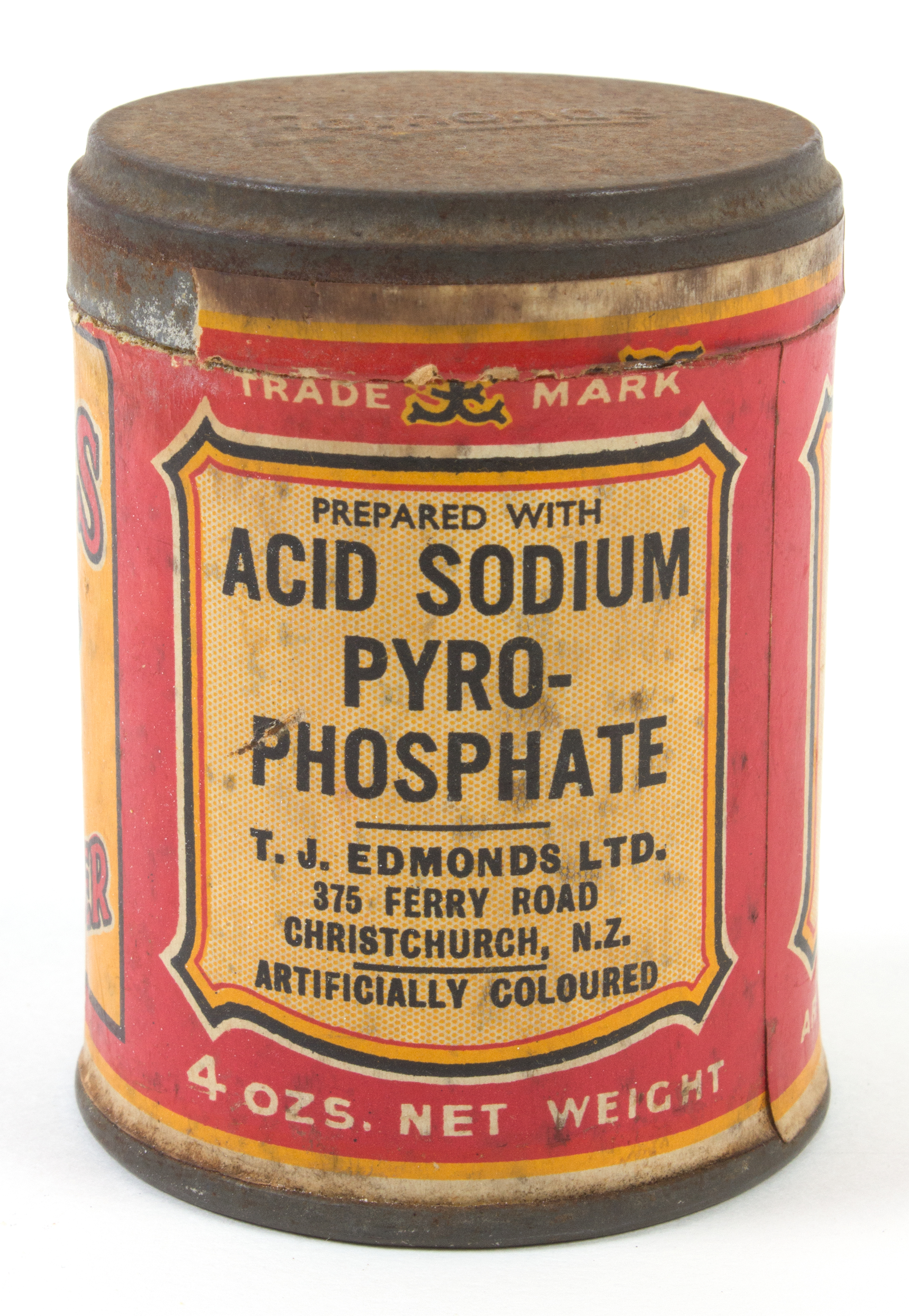
Baking powder with sodium acid pyrophosphate, New Zealand, 1950s

Over time, most baking powder manufacturers have experimented with their products, combining or even replacing what were once key ingredients. Information in the following table reflects the original ingredients as introduced by different individuals and companies. The ingredients used may be very different from later formulations and current products. Where an ingredient had multiple names, they are all listed together in the first occurrence, and the most common name listed thereafter.

The base for all these products is sodium bicarbonate, also known as baking soda.

Company	Date introduced	Acid	Base	Desiccant	Type	Product names
Alfred Bird, England	1843	cream of tartar / tartaric acid / potassium bitartrate / KC_{4}H_{5}O_{6}	baking soda	starch	single-acting	Bird's Baking Powder
Eben Norton Horsford, United States	1856–1869	phosphatic / monocalcium phosphate / calcium acid phosphate / Ca(H_{2}PO_{4})_{2}	baking soda	cornstarch	double-acting	Horsford's Yeast Powder; Rumford Baking Powder; Horsford-Liebig Baking Powder
August Oetker, Germany	1891–1903	phosphatic / monocalcium phosphate / calcium acid phosphate / Ca(H_{2}PO_{4})_{2}	baking soda	cornstarch	double-acting	Dr. Oetker's Baking Powder, Backin
Joseph C. Hoagland, Cornelius Hoagland, later William Ziegler, United States	1866–1868	cream of tartar / tartaric acid / potassium bitartrate / KC_{4}H_{5}O_{6}	baking soda	starch	single-acting	Dr. Price Baking Powder (Ziegler); Royal Baking Powder (Joseph Hoagland); Cleveland Baking Powder (Cornelius Hoagland)
William Monroe Wright, George Campbell Rew, United States	1888	alum / sodium aluminium sulfate / NaAl(SO_{4})_{2}·12H_{2}O	baking soda	cornstarch, albumen	double-acting	Calumet Baking Powder
Herman Hulman, United States	1870–1899	alum / sodium aluminium sulfate / NaAl(SO_{4})_{2}·12H_{2}O	baking soda	cornstarch	double-acting	Clabber or Clabber Girl Baking Powder
Byron H. Smith, United States	1940s	phosphatic / sodium acid pyrophosphate	baking soda	cornstarch	double-acting	Bakewell or Bakewell Cream Baking Powder

The formation of a brand's current baking powder may be very different from the original formula they produced, shown above. They may now use combinations of acids, or different acids altogether. As of 2010, the two main baking powder companies in the United States were Clabber Girl and Calumet. Calumet held about 1/3 of the American baking powder market, with Clabber Girl (which produces the Clabber Girl, Rumford, and Davis brands of baking powder, among others) dominating 2/3. (Davis baking powder is commonly found in the northeastern United States.)

== How much to use ==
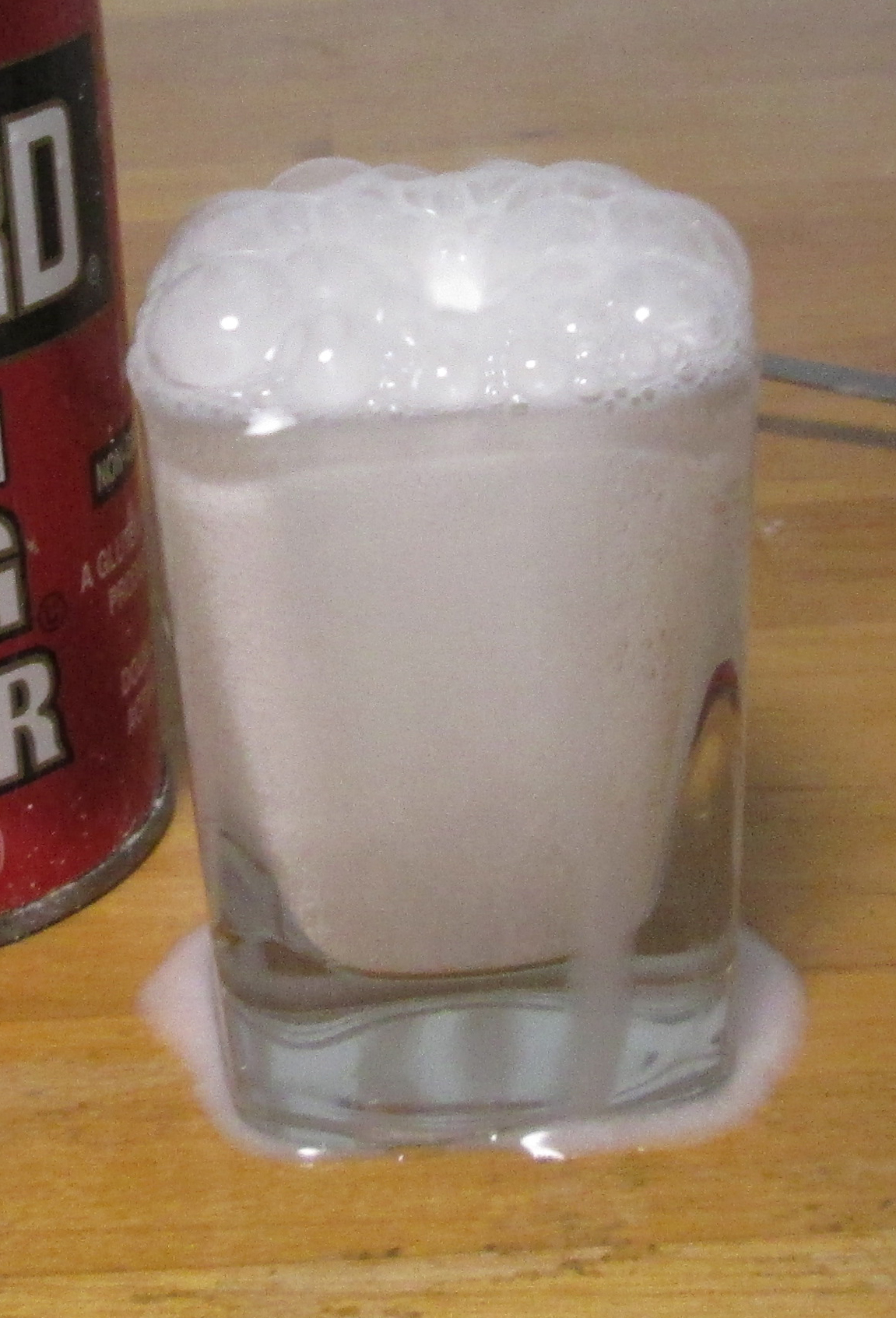
Effective baking powder foams when placed in hot water.

Generally, one teaspoon (5 g or 1/6 oz) of baking powder is used to raise a mixture of one cup (120 g or 4oz) of flour, one cup of liquid, and one egg. On a sachet of Dr. Oetker's baking powder it is written that it contains 15 grams and is for use with 500 grams flour .

However, if the mixture is acidic, baking powder's additional acids remain unconsumed in the chemical reaction and often lend an unpleasant taste to food. High acidity can be caused by ingredients such as buttermilk, lemon juice, yogurt, citrus, or honey. When excessive acid is present, some of the baking powder should be replaced with baking soda. For example, one cup of flour, one egg, and one cup of buttermilk requires only 1/2 teaspoon of baking powder—the remaining leavening is caused by buttermilk acids reacting with 1/4 teaspoon of baking soda.

However, with baking powders that contain sodium acid pyrophosphate, excess alkaline substances can sometimes deprotonate the acid in two steps instead of the one that normally occurs, resulting in an offensive bitter taste to baked goods. Calcium compounds and aluminium compounds do not have that problem, though, since calcium compounds that deprotonate twice are insoluble and aluminium compounds do not deprotonate in that fashion.

== Expiration data ==
Moisture and heat can cause baking powder to lose its effectiveness over time, and commercial varieties have a somewhat arbitrary expiration date printed on the container. Regardless of the expiration date, the effectiveness can be tested by placing a teaspoon of the powder into a small container of hot water. If it bubbles vigorously, it is still active and usable.

== Comparisons ==
Different brands of baking powder can perform quite differently in the oven. Early baking powder companies published their own cookbooks, to promote their new products, to educate cooks about exactly how and when to use them, and because cooks could not easily adapt recipes that were developed using different types of baking powder. Baking powders using cream-of-tartar, phosphates, or alums could behave very differently, and required different amounts for a desired rising effect.

The Horsford Cookbook, 1877

The Horsford 1887 almanac and cook book, 1887

The Rumford Cook Book, 1910

In 2015, Cook's Country, an American TV show and magazine, evaluated six baking powders marketed to consumers. In one test, six U.S. brands were used to bake white cake, cream biscuits, and chocolate cookies. Depending on the brand, the thickness of the cakes varied by up to 20% (from 0.89 to 1.24 in). It was also found that the lower-rising products made what were judged to be better chocolate cookies. Also, 30% of the testers (n=21) noted a metallic flavor in cream biscuits made with brands containing aluminium.

== Substituting in recipes ==
=== Substitute acids ===
As described above, baking powder is mainly just baking soda mixed with an acid. In principle, a number of kitchen acids may be combined with baking soda to simulate commercial baking powders. Vinegar (dilute acetic acid), especially white vinegar, is also a common acidifier in baking; for example, many heirloom chocolate cake recipes call for a tablespoon or two of vinegar. Where a recipe already uses buttermilk or yogurt, baking soda can be used without cream of tartar (or with less). Alternatively, lemon juice can be substituted for some of the liquid in the recipe, to provide the required acidity to activate the baking soda. The main variable with the use of these kitchen acids is the rate of leavening.

== See also ==
- Bakewell Cream
- Calumet Baking Powder Company
- Clabber Girl, also owns the Rumford, Davis, Hearth Club and Royal brands
- Dr. Oetker
- Irish soda bread
