= Sodium aluminium phosphate =

Names
- Other names: E541; aluminium sodium salt

Identifiers
CAS Number	8:2:3: 10279-59-1; acidic: 10305-76-7; generic: 7785-88-8
3D model (JSmol)	8:2:3: Interactive image; acidic: Interactive image
Abbreviations	SALP, SAlP
ChemSpider	8:2:3: 57530678; acidic: 32698344
ECHA InfoCard	100.029.173
EC Number	232-090-4
E number	E541 (acidity regulators, ...)
PubChem CID	3032541; 8:2:3: 138394176; acidic: 72941495
UNII	acidic: 7N091Y877O
CompTox Dashboard (EPA)	DTXSID8047478; 8:2:3: DTXSID20872524; acidic: DTXSID80872525
- InChI: 8:2:3: InChI=1S/2Al.3Na.8H3O4P/c;;;;;8*1-5(2,3)4/h;;;;;8*(H3,1,2,3,4)/q2*+3;3*+1;;;;;;;;/p-9 Key: FTUJNWMMNUTGTH-UHFFFAOYSA-E; acidic: InChI=1S/3Al.Na.8H3O4P.4H2O/c;;;;8*1-5(2,3)4;;;;/h;;;;8*(H3,1,2,3,4);4*1H2/q3*+3;+1;;;;;;;;;;;;/p-10 Key: IQQWMJSNEUUJAY-UHFFFAOYSA-D
- SMILES: 8:2:3: OP(=O)(O)[O-].OP(=O)(O)[O-].OP(=O)(O)[O-].OP(=O)(O)[O-].OP(=O)(O)[O-].OP(=O)(O)[O-].OP(=O)(O)[O-].OP(=O)([O-])[O-].[Na+].[Na+].[Na+].[Al+3].[Al+3]; acidic: O.O.O.O.OP(=O)(O)[O-].OP(=O)(O)[O-].OP(=O)(O)[O-].OP(=O)(O)[O-].OP(=O)(O)[O-].OP(=O)(O)[O-].OP(=O)([O-])[O-].OP(=O)([O-])[O-].[Na+].[Al+3].[Al+3].[Al+3]

Properties
Chemical formula	NaH_{14}Al_{3}(PO_{4})_{8}·4H_{2}O
Molar mass	144.943 g/mol
Appearance	white powder
Odor	odorless
Solubility in water	insoluble
Solubility	soluble in HCl
- Except where otherwise noted, data are given for materials in their standard state (at 25 °C [77 °F], 100 kPa). verify (what is ?) Infobox references

Sodium aluminium phosphate (SAlP) are sodium salts of aluminium phosphates. They are inorganic and most commonly have the formulas NaH_{14}Al_{3}(PO_{4})_{8}·4H_{2}O and Na_{3}H_{15}Al_{2}(PO_{4})_{8}. These materials are prepared by combining alumina, phosphoric acid, and sodium hydroxide.

In addition to the usual hydrate, an anhydrous SAlP is also known, Na_{3}H_{15}Al_{2}(PO_{4})_{8} (CAS#10279-59-1), referred to as 8:2:3, reflecting the ratio of phosphate to aluminium to sodium. Additionally an SAlP of ill-defined stoichiometry is used (Na_{x}Al_{y}(PO_{4})_{z} (CAS# 7785-88-8).

The acidic sodium aluminium phosphates are used as acids for baking powders for the chemical leavening of baked goods. Upon heating, SAlP combines with the baking soda to give carbon dioxide. Most of its action occurs at baking temperatures, rather than when the dough or batter is mixed at room temperature. SAlPs are advantageous because they impart a neutral flavor.

As a food additive, it has the E number E541. In the EU and the UK, its use is restricted a small number of foods, in particular multi-coloured sponge cakes, e.g. the Battenberg cake.

Basic sodium aluminium phosphates are also known, e.g., Na_{15}Al_{3}(PO_{4})_{8}. These species are useful in cheese making.
