= Monocalcium phosphate =

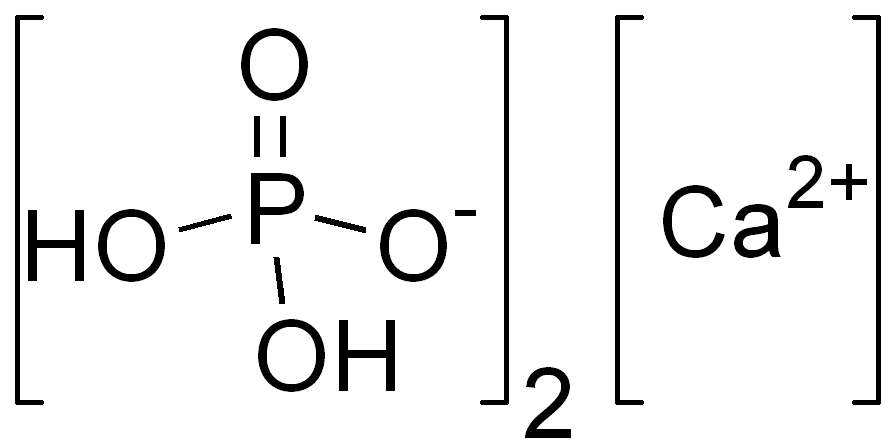

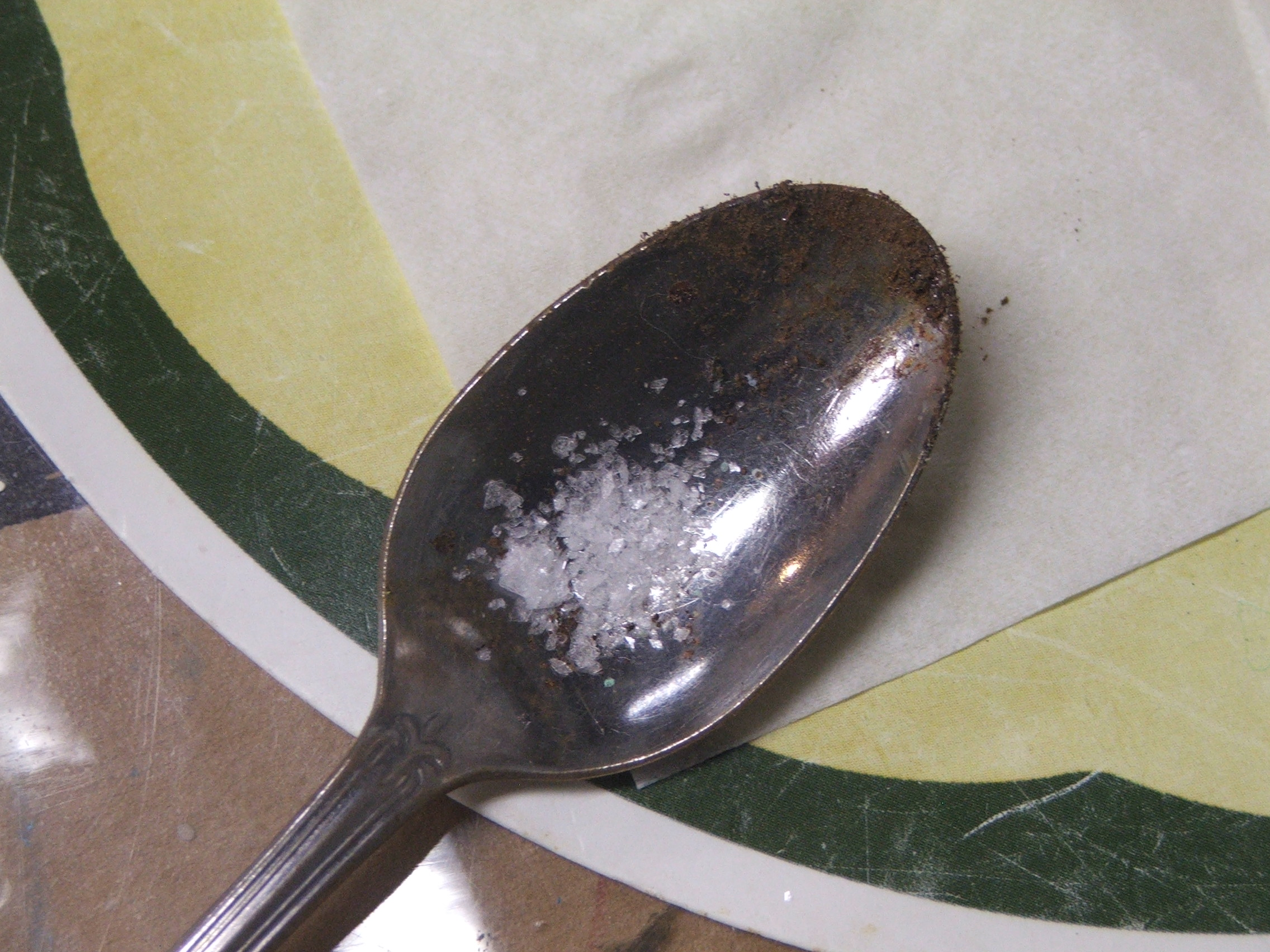

Names
- IUPAC name Calcium bis(dihydrogen phosphate)
- Other names Acid calcium phosphate Calcium acid phosphate Calcium diorthophosphate Calcium biphosphate Calcium superphosphate Monobasic calcium phosphate Monocalcium orthophosphate Phosphoric acid, calcium salt (2:1)

Identifiers
CAS Number	7758-23-8; 10031-30-8 (monohydrate)
3D model (JSmol)	Interactive image
ChemSpider	22862
ECHA InfoCard	100.028.943
E number	E341(i) (antioxidants, ...)
PubChem CID	24454
UNII	701EKV9RMN; 0N4E6L5449 (monohydrate)
CompTox Dashboard (EPA)	DTXSID2044262
- InChI: InChI=1S/Ca.2H3O4P/c;2*1-5(2,3)4/h;2*(H3,1,2,3,4)/q+2;;/p-2 Key: YYRMJZQKEFZXMX-UHFFFAOYSA-L; InChI=1/Ca.2H3O4P/c;2*1-5(2,3)4/h;2*(H3,1,2,3,4)/q+2;;/p-2 Key: YYRMJZQKEFZXMX-NUQVWONBAY
- SMILES: OP(=O)(O)[O-].OP(=O)(O)[O-].[Ca+2]

Properties
Chemical formula	CaH_{4}P_{2}O_{8}
Molar mass	234.05 g/mol
Appearance	White powder
Density	2.220 g/cm^{3}
Melting point	109 °C (228 °F; 382 K)
Boiling point	203 °C (397 °F; 476 K) (decomposes)
Solubility in water	2 g/100 mL
Refractive index (n_{D})	1.5176

Structure
Crystal structure	Triclinic

Hazards
NFPA 704 (fire diamond)	1 0 0
Flash point	Non-flammable

Related compounds
Other anions	Calcium pyrophosphate
Other cations	Magnesium phosphate Dicalcium phosphate Tricalcium phosphate Strontium phosphate
- Except where otherwise noted, data are given for materials in their standard state (at 25 °C [77 °F], 100 kPa). verify (what is ?) Infobox references

Monocalcium phosphate is an inorganic compound with the chemical formula Ca(H_{2}PO_{4})_{2} ("AMCP" or "CMP-A" for anhydrous monocalcium phosphate). It is commonly found as the monohydrate ("MCP" or "MCP-M"), Ca(H_{2}PO_{4})_{2}·H_{2}O. Both salts are colourless solids. They are used mainly as superphosphate fertilizers and are also popular leavening agents.

== Preparation ==
Material of relatively high purity, as required for baking, is produced by treating calcium hydroxide with phosphoric acid:

Ca(OH)_{2} + 2 H_{3}PO_{4} → Ca(H_{2}PO_{4})_{2} + 2 H_{2}O

Samples of Ca(H_{2}PO_{4})_{2} tend to convert to dicalcium phosphate:

Ca(H_{2}PO_{4})_{2} → Ca(HPO_{4}) + H_{3}PO_{4}

== Applications ==
=== Use in fertilizers ===
Superphosphate fertilizers are produced by treatment of "phosphate rock" with acids ("acidulation"). Using phosphoric acid, fluorapatite is converted to Ca(H_{2}PO_{4})_{2}:

Ca_{5}(PO_{4})_{3}F + 7 H_{3}PO_{4} → 5 Ca(H_{2}PO_{4})_{2} + HF

This solid is called triple superphosphate. Several million tons are produced annually for use as fertilizers. Using sulfuric acid, fluorapatite is converted to a mixture of Ca(H_{2}PO_{4})_{2} and CaSO_{4}. This solid is called single superphosphate.

Residual HF typically reacts with silicate minerals co-mingled with the phosphate ores to produce hexafluorosilicic acid (H_{2}SiF_{6}). The majority of the hexafluorosilicic acid is converted to aluminium fluoride and cryolite for the processing of aluminium. These materials are central to the conversion of aluminium ore into aluminium metal.

When sulfuric acid is used, the product contains phosphogypsum (CaSO_{4}·2H_{2}O) and is called single superphosphate.

=== Use as leavening agent ===
Calcium dihydrogen phosphate is used in the food industry as a leavening agent, i.e., to cause baked goods to rise. Because it is acidic, when combined with an alkali carbonate ingredient, commonly sodium bicarbonate (baking soda) or potassium bicarbonate, it reacts to produce carbon dioxide and a salt. Outward pressure of the carbon dioxide gas causes the rising effect. When combined in a ready-made baking powder, the acid and alkali ingredients are included in the right proportions such that they will exactly neutralize each other and not significantly affect the overall pH of the product. AMCP and MCP are fast acting, releasing most carbon dioxide within minutes of mixing. It is popularly used in pancake mixes. In double-acting baking powders, MCP is often combined with the slow-acting acid sodium acid pyrophosphate (SAPP).

== See also ==
- Dicalcium phosphate
- Triple superphosphate
