= GDPase =

GDPase may refer to:

- Nucleoside-diphosphatase
- Guanosine-diphosphatase
