= Cytokine storm =

Frequently fatal immune reaction

- Other names: hypercytokinemia
- Specialty: Immunology

A cytokine storm, also called hypercytokinemia, is a pathological reaction in humans and other animals in which the innate immune system causes an uncontrolled and excessive release of pro-inflammatory signaling molecules called cytokines. Cytokines are a normal part of the body's immune response to infection, but their sudden release in large quantities may cause multisystem organ failure and death.

Cytokine storms may be caused by infectious or non-infectious etiologies, especially viral respiratory infections such as H1N1 influenza, H5N1 influenza, SARS-CoV-1, SARS-CoV-2, Influenza B, and parainfluenza virus. Other causative agents include the Epstein-Barr virus, cytomegalovirus, group A streptococcus, and non-infectious conditions such as graft-versus-host disease. The viruses can invade lung epithelial cells and alveolar macrophages to produce viral nucleic acid, which stimulates the infected cells to release cytokines and chemokines, activating macrophages, dendritic cells, and others.

Cytokine storm syndrome is a diverse set of conditions that can result in a cytokine storm. Cytokine storm syndromes include familial hemophagocytic lymphohistiocytosis, Epstein-Barr virus–associated hemophagocytic lymphohistiocytosis, systemic or non-systemic juvenile idiopathic arthritis–associated macrophage activation syndrome, NLRC4 macrophage activation syndrome, cytokine release syndrome and sepsis.

== Cytokine storms versus cytokine release syndrome ==
The term "cytokine storm" is often loosely used interchangeably with cytokine release syndrome (CRS) but is more precisely a differentiable syndrome that may represent a severe episode of cytokine release syndrome or a component of another disease entity, such as macrophage activation syndrome. When occurring as a result of a therapy, CRS symptoms may be delayed until days or weeks after treatment. Immediate-onset (fulminant) CRS appears to be a cytokine storm.

== Research ==
Nicotinamide (a form of vitamin B_{3}) is under laboratory research as a possible inhibitor of proinflammatory cytokines. As of 2018, magnesium was under research for its potential to decrease inflammatory cytokine production in the immune system.

== History ==
The first reference to the term cytokine storm in the published medical literature appears to be by James Ferrara in 1993 during a discussion of graft vs. host disease, a condition in which the role of excessive and self-perpetuating cytokine release had already been under discussion for many years. The term next appeared in a discussion of pancreatitis in 2002. In 2003, it was first used in reference to a reaction to an infection.

It is believed that cytokine storms were responsible for the disproportionate number of healthy young adult deaths during the 1918 influenza pandemic, which killed an estimated 50 million people worldwide. In this case, a healthy immune system may have been a liability rather than an asset. Preliminary research results from Taiwan also indicated this as the probable reason for many deaths during the SARS epidemic in 2003. Human deaths from the bird flu H5N1 usually involve cytokine storms as well. Cytokine storm has also been implicated in hantavirus pulmonary syndrome.

In 2006, a study at Northwick Park Hospital in England resulted in all 6 of the volunteers given the drug theralizumab becoming critically ill, with multiple organ failure, high fever, and a systemic inflammatory response. Parexel, a company conducting trials for pharmaceutical companies claimed that theralizumab could cause a cytokine storm—the dangerous reaction the men experienced.

=== Relationship to COVID-19 ===
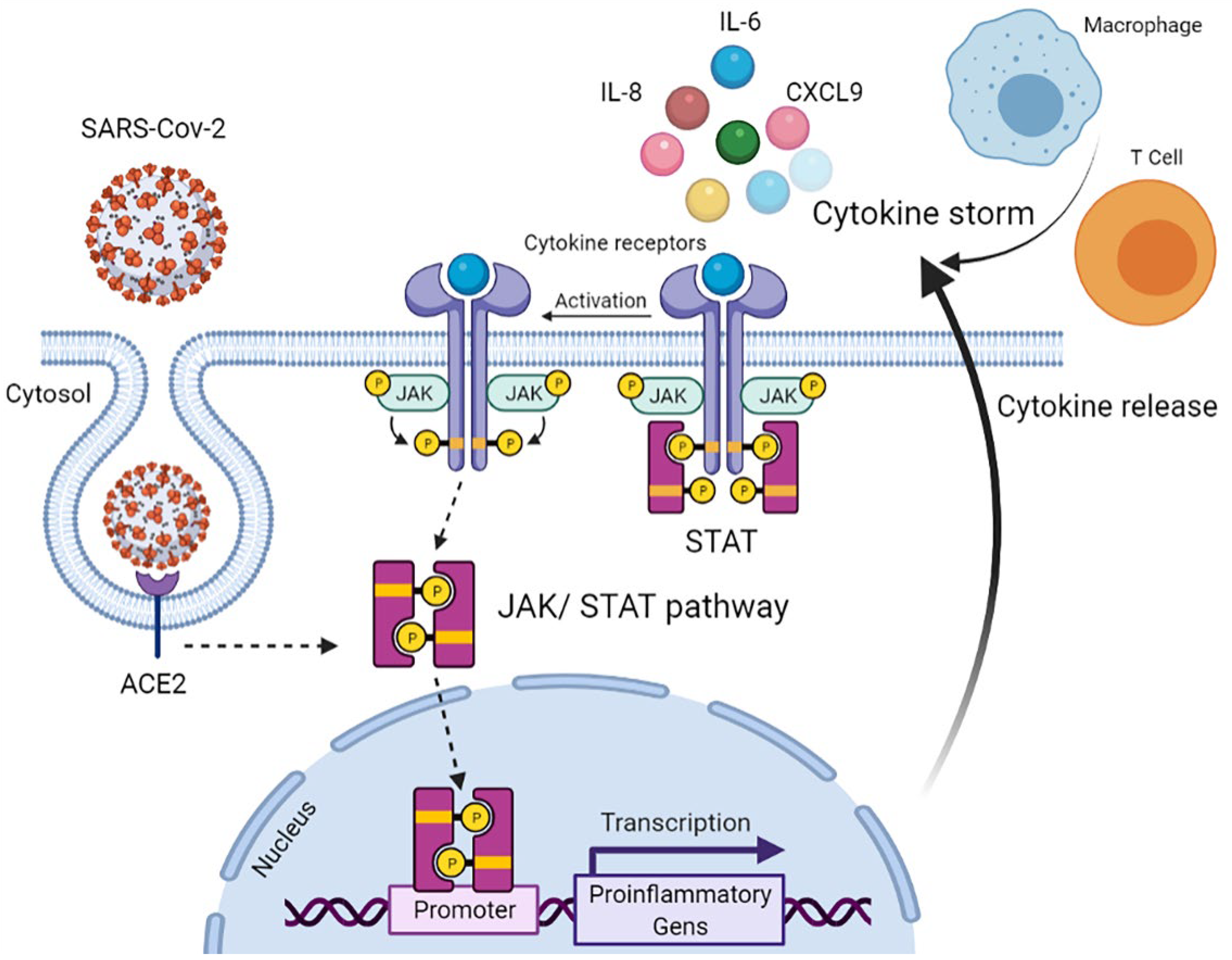
Cytokine release via activation of JAK/STAT signalling pathway following SARS-Cov-2 infection resulting in ARDS related to COVID-19. Abbreviations: ACE2: Angiotensin-converting enzyme 2, CXCL9: Chemokine (C–X–C motif) ligand 9, IL: interleukin, JAK: Janus kinase, and STAT: signal transducer and activator of transcription.

During the COVID-19 pandemic, some doctors have attributed many deaths to cytokine storms. A cytokine storm can cause the severe symptoms of acute respiratory distress syndrome (ARDS), which has a high mortality rate in COVID-19 patients. SARS-CoV-2 activates the immune system resulting in a release of a large number of cytokines, including IL-6, which can increase vascular permeability and cause a migration of fluid and blood cells into the alveoli leading to such consequent symptoms as dyspnea and respiratory failure. In an autopsy study from Karolinska Hospital, 29 pleural effusions of deceased COVID-19 patients were analyzed. Out of 184 protein markers, 20 markers were raised significantly in COVID-19 deceased patients. A group of markers showed over-stimulation of the immune system, including ADA, BTC, CA12, CAPG, CD40, CDCP1, CXCL9, ENTPD2, Flt3L, IL-6, IL-8, LRP1, OSM, PD-L1, PTN, STX8, and VEGFA; furthermore, DPP6 and EDIL3 indicated damage to arterial and cardiovascular organs. The higher mortality has been linked to the effects of ARDS aggravation and the tissue damage that can result in organ-failure and/or death.

ARDS was shown to be the cause of mortality in 70% of COVID-19 deaths. A cytokine plasma level analysis showed that in cases of severe SARS-CoV-2 infection, the levels of many interleukins and cytokines are highly elevated, indicating evidence of a cytokine storm. Additionally, postmortem examination of patients with COVID-19 has shown a large accumulation of inflammatory cells in lung tissues including macrophages and T-helper cells.

Early recognition of a cytokine storm in COVID-19 patients is crucial to ensure the best outcome for recovery, allowing treatment with a variety of biological agents that target the cytokines to reduce their levels. Meta-analysis suggests clear patterns distinguishing patients with or without severe disease. Possible predictors of severe and fatal cases may include lymphopenia, thrombocytopenia and high levels of ferritin, D-dimer, aspartate aminotransferase, lactate dehydrogenase, C-reactive protein, neutrophils, procalcitonin and creatinine as well as interleukin-6 (IL-6). Ferritin and IL-6 are considered to be possible immunological biomarkers for severe and fatal cases of COVID-19. Ferritin and C-reactive protein may be possible screening tools for early diagnosis of systemic inflammatory response syndrome in cases of COVID-19.

Due to the increased levels of cytokines and interferons in patients with severe COVID-19, both have been investigated as potential targets for SARS-CoV-2 therapy. An animal study found that mice producing an early strong interferon response to SARS-CoV-2 were likely to live, but in other cases the disease progressed to a highly morbid overactive immune system. The high mortality rate of COVID-19 in older populations has been attributed to the impact of age on interferon responses.

Clinical trials continue to identify causes of cytokine storms in COVID-19 cases. One such cause is the delayed Type I interferon response that leads to accumulation of pathogenic monocytes. High viremia is also associated with exacerbated Type I interferons response and worse prognosis. Diabetes, hypertension, and cardiovascular disease are all risk factors of cytokine storms in COVID-19 patients.
