= Adenosine diphosphatase =

Adenosine diphosphatase may refer to:

- Apyrase, an enzyme
- Nucleoside-diphosphatase, an enzyme
