= Apyrase =

Enzyme

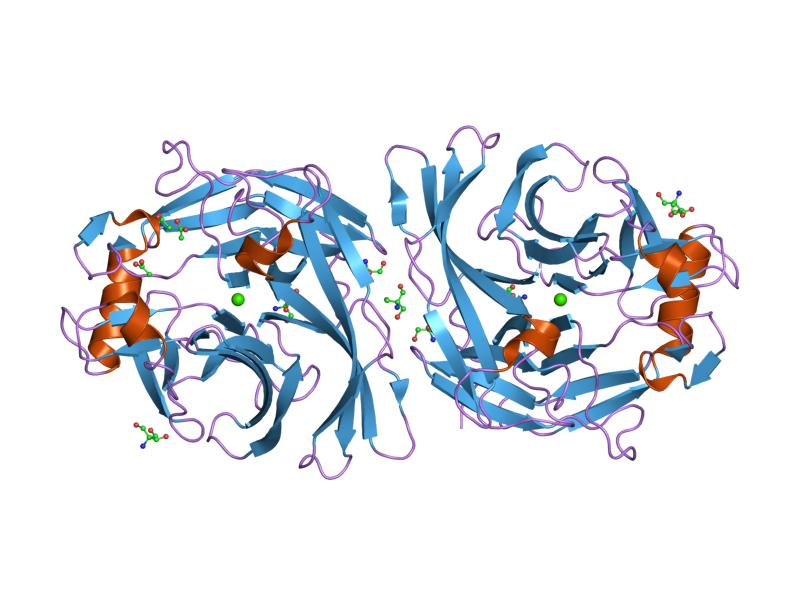
- structure and protein design of human CANT1, a relative of apyrase

Identifiers
- EC no.: 3.6.1.5
- CAS no.: 9028-86-8

Databases
- BRENDA: enzyme data
- ExPASy: NiceZyme view
- KEGG: enzyme entry
- MetaCyc: metabolic pathway
- Rhea: reactions
- PDB structures: RCSB PDB PDBe PDBsum
- Gene Ontology: AmiGO / QuickGO
Search
- PMC: articles
- PubMed: articles
- NCBI: proteins

Apyrases (EC 3.6.1.5, ATP-diphosphatase, adenosine diphosphatases, ADPases, ATP diphosphohydrolases) are a type of calcium-activated plasma membrane-bound enzyme (magnesium can also activate it) (EC 3.6.1.5) that catalyses the hydrolysis of ATP to yield AMP and inorganic phosphate. This type of activity is found in members of the ecto-NTPDase family such as ENTPD2 and ENTPD3 in humans, and is also found in plants and blood feeding anthropods.

It can also act on ADP and other nucleoside triphosphates and diphosphates with the general reaction being NTP -> NDP + Pi -> NMP + 2Pi. This is the same activity that has been employed in the degradation of unincorporated nucleosides during pyrosequencing.

== In plants ==
Two isoenzymes are found in commercial preparations from potatoes. One with a higher ratio of substrate selectivity for ATP:ADP (approx 10) and another with no selectivity (ratio 1).

== In arthropods ==
The salivary apyrases of blood-feeding arthropods are nucleotide hydrolysing enzymes that are implicated in the inhibition of host platelet aggregation through the hydrolysis of extracellular adenosine diphosphate. These proteins are related to the human enzyme CANT1, which acts as a nucleoside diphosphate phosphatase (EC 3.6.1.6).
