= Zuotin =

Identifiers
- Organism: Saccharomyces cerevisiae
- Symbol: ZUO1
- Orthologs: OMA: entry
- UniProt: P32527
Search for
- Structures: Swiss-model
- Domains: InterPro

Z-DNA binding protein 1, also known as Zuotin, is a Saccharomyces cerevisiae yeast gene.

Zuo1 has been identified in vitro as a tRNA and Z-DNA binding protein. The name "zuotin" is derived from the Chinese word "zuo" meaning "left". It is a member of Hsp40 family. Like all other Hsp40 members it also contains a classic J domain.

In 1990, Shuguang Zhang of MIT made a serendipitous discovery of a self-assembling peptide in yeast protein Zuotin. This discovery led to the development of a new field of peptide nanobiotechnology and to designs of a variety of self-assembling peptides for widespread uses, including peptide hydrogels in materials science, 3D tissue cell culture and tissue engineering, nanomedicine, sustained molecular releases, clinical and surgical applications.

Zuotin and related proteins contain a unique Zuotin homology domain (ZHD). It associates with the Hsp70 family Ssz1 to form a ribosome associated complex (RAC). In such a complex, the N-terminal domains (including the J domain) associates with Ssz1p on the surface of the large (60S) ribosomal subunit. ZHD provides further contacts with the 60S subunit and connects to a subunit-spanning medium domain (MD), the "neck" of RAC. The four-helix-bundle RAC head domain is located at the C-terminus and binds the small (40S) subunit. The J domain-Ssz1p complex, located over the peptide exit tunnel of the large ribosomal subunit, helps the nascent peptide fold.
