= CCDC176 =

Protein

Basal body-orientation factor 1

Identifiers
- Symbol: BBOF1
- NCBI gene: 80127
- HGNC: 19855
- RefSeq: NP_079333.2
- UniProt: Q8ND07

Other data
- Locus: Chr. 14 q24.3
Search for
- Structures: Swiss-model
- Domains: InterPro

Basal body-orientation factor 1 (BBOF1) is a protein that in humans is encoded by the gene CCDC176, which is located on the plus strand of chromosome 14 at 14q24.3. CCDC176 is neighbored by ALDH6A1 and ENTPD5 at the same locus. The mRNA is 3123 base pairs long and has 12 exons, the protein is 529 amino acids long and has a molecular weight of 61987 Da and a predicted isoelectric point of 9.07 in humans.

== Homology and evolution ==
CCDC176 has no known paralogs and is orthologous in primates, mammals, birds, reptiles, amphibians, fish, all the way back to invertebrates, a fungal parasite and a proteobacteria. The domain found to be homologous is the DUF4515, a domain of unknown function.

== Protein function and characteristics ==
This basal body protein has been shown in multiciliated cells to align and maintain cilia orientation in response to flow. This protein may also act by mediating a maturation step that stabilizes and aligns cilia orientation.

No other genes or proteins have been found that encode basal body orientation factors. A similar set of genes, tubulin tyrosine ligase-like genes 3 and 6, has been found in zebrafish that maintain cilia structure and motility. These genes belong to the TTL (tubulin tyrosine ligase) family.

BBOF1 has two coiled coil domains, one that is 117 amino acids in length at the position 85-201 and the second is 91 amino acids in length at the position 271-361. There is also a region of interest located at the position 77-270 and is named DUF4515, a domain of unknown function belonging to the family of pfam14988.

There are three predicted protein-protein interactions concerning CCDC176. The most prevalent and most likely interaction is with LIG4, a human gene that encodes the protein DNA Ligase IV. Two experiments in a publication of 1030 unique reactions support the LIG4-CCDC176 interaction. The second and third predicted interactions are NRF1 and HYLS1.

The predicted secondary structure of BBOF1 in humans is as follows: 87.1% alpha helix, 63.9% beta sheet, and 15.7% beta turn.

== Expression, research, and clinical significance ==
CCDC176 has known expression in the human testis, cerebellum, and lung tissues.

There are six articles of research related to the gene CCDC176, with four out of six being large-scale sequencing, one article not naming the gene or protein, and one article with only the abstract available. This last article, Global, in vivo, and site-specific phosphorylation dynamics in signaling networks, is the only article that directly mentions the protein of interest and it does so only once. This study detected 6,600 phosphorylation sites on 2,244 proteins.

Expression data from different health states in humans predicts high expression of CCDC176 in glioma. The interaction data concerning CCDC176 and LIG4 came from a publication studying protein-protein interaction involved with the DNA damage response network in association with cancer
