= Biomimetic material =

Materials inspired by natural structures

Biomimetic materials are materials developed using inspiration from nature. This may be useful in the design of composite materials. Natural structures have inspired and innovated human creations. Notable examples of these natural structures include: honeycomb structure of the beehive, strength of spider silks, bird flight mechanics, and shark skin water repellency.

The etymological roots of the neologism "biomimetic" derive from Greek, since bios means "life" and mimetikos means "imitative".

== Tissue engineering ==
Biomimetic materials in tissue engineering are materials that have been designed such that they elicit specified cellular responses mediated by interactions with scaffold-tethered peptides from extracellular matrix (ECM) proteins; essentially, the incorporation of cell-binding peptides into biomaterials via chemical or physical modification. Amino acids located within the peptides are used as building blocks by other biological structures. These peptides are often referred to as "self-assembling peptides", since they can be modified to contain biologically active motifs. This allows them to replicate information derived from tissue and to reproduce the same information independently. Thus, these peptides act as building blocks capable of conducting multiple biochemical activities, including tissue engineering. Tissue engineering research currently being performed on both short chain and long chain peptides is still in early stages.

Such peptides include both native long chains of ECM proteins as well as short peptide sequences derived from intact ECM proteins. The idea is that the biomimetic material will mimic some of the roles that an ECM plays in neural tissue. In addition to promoting cellular growth and mobilization, the incorporated peptides could also mediate by specific protease enzymes or initiate cellular responses not present in a local native tissue.

In the beginning, long chains of ECM proteins including fibronectin (FN), vitronectin (VN), and laminin (LN) were used, but more recently the advantages of using short peptides have been discovered. Short peptides are more advantageous because, unlike the long chains that fold randomly upon adsorption causing the active protein domains to be sterically unavailable, short peptides remain stable and do not hide the receptor binding domains when adsorbed. Another advantage to short peptides is that they can be replicated more economically due to the smaller size. A bi-functional cross-linker with a long spacer arm is used to tether peptides to the substrate surface. If a functional group is not available for attaching the cross-linker, photochemical immobilization may be used.

In addition to modifying the surface, biomaterials can be modified in bulk, meaning that the cell signaling peptides and recognition sites are present not just on the surface but also throughout the bulk of the material. The strength of cell attachment, cell migration rate, and extent of cytoskeletal organization formation is determined by the receptor binding to the ligand bound to the material; thus, receptor-ligand affinity, the density of the ligand, and the spatial distribution of the ligand must be carefully considered when designing a biomimetic material.

== Biomimetic mineralization ==
Proteins of the developing enamel extracellular matrix (such as amelogenin) control initial mineral deposition (nucleation) and subsequent crystal growth, ultimately determining the physico-mechanical properties of the mature mineralized tissue. Nucleators bring together mineral ions from the surrounding fluids (such as saliva) into the form of a crystal lattice structure, by stabilizing small nuclei to permit crystal growth, forming mineral tissue. Mutations in enamel ECM proteins result in enamel defects such as amelogenesis imperfecta. Type-I collagen is thought to have a similar role for the formation of dentin and bone.

Dental enamel mineral (as well as dentin and bone) is made of hydroxylapatite with foreign ions incorporated in the structure. Carbonate, fluoride, and magnesium are the most common heteroionic substituents.

In a biomimetic mineralization strategy based on normal enamel histogenesis, a three-dimensional scaffold is formed to attract and arrange calcium and/or phosphate ions to induce de novo precipitation of hydroxylapatite.

Two general strategies have been applied. One is using fragments known to support natural mineralization proteins, such as Amelogenin, Collagen, or Dentin Phosphophoryn as the basis. Alternatively, de novo macromolecular structures have been designed to support mineralization, not based on natural molecules, but on rational design. One example is oligopeptide P11-4.

In dental orthopedics and implants, a more traditional strategy to improve the density of the underlying jaw bone is via the in situ application of calcium phosphate materials. Commonly used materials include hydroxylapatite, tricalcium phosphate, and calcium phosphate cement. Newer bioactive glasses follow this line of strategy, where the added silicone provides an important bonus to the local absorption of calcium.

== Extracellular matrix proteins ==
Many studies utilize laminin-1 when designing a biomimetic material. Laminin is a component of the extracellular matrix that is able to promote neuron attachment and differentiation, in addition to axon growth guidance. Its primary functional site for bioactivity is its core protein domain isoleucine-lysine-valine-alanine-valine (IKVAV), which is located in the α-1 chain of laminin.

A recent study by Wu, Zheng et al., synthesized a self-assembled IKVAV peptide nanofiber and tested its effect on the adhesion of neuron-like pc12 cells. Early cell adhesion is very important for preventing cell degeneration; the longer cells are suspended in culture, the more likely they are to degenerate. The purpose was to develop a biomaterial with good cell adherence and bioactivity with IKVAV, which is able to inhibit differentiation and adhesion of glial cells in addition to promoting neuronal cell adhesion and differentiation. The IKVAV peptide domain is on the surface of the nanofibers so that it is exposed and accessible for promoting cell contact interactions. The IKVAV nanofibers promoted stronger cell adherence than the electrostatic attraction induced by poly-L-lysine, and cell adherence increased with increasing density of IKVAV until the saturation point was reached. IKVAV does not exhibit time dependent effects because the adherence was shown to be the same at 1 hour and at 3 hours.

Laminin is known to stimulate neurite outgrowth and it plays a role in the developing nervous system. It is known that gradients are critical for the guidance of growth cones to their target tissues in the developing nervous system. There has been much research done on soluble gradients; however, little emphasis has been placed on gradients of substratum bound substances of the extracellular matrix such as laminin. Dodla and Bellamkonda, fabricated an anisotropic 3D agarose gel with gradients of coupled laminin-1 (LN-1). Concentration gradients of LN-1 were shown to promote faster neurite extension than the highest neurite growth rate observed with isotropic LN-1 concentrations. Neurites grew both up and down the gradients, but growth was faster at less steep gradients and was faster up the gradients than down the gradients.

== Biomimetic artificial muscles ==
Electroactive polymers (EAPs) are also known as artificial muscles. EAPs are polymeric materials and they are able to produce large deformation when applied in an electric field. This provides large potential in applications in biotechnology and robotics, sensors, and actuators.

== Biomimetic photonic structures ==
The production of structural colours concerns a large array of organisms. From bacteria (Flavobacterium strain IR1) to multicellular organisms, (Hibiscus trionum, Doryteuthis pealeii (squid), or Chrysochroa fulgidissima (beetle)), manipulation of light is not limited to rare and exotic life forms. Different organisms evolved different mechanisms to produce structural colours: multilayered cuticle in some insects and plants, grating like surface in plants, geometrically organised cells in bacteria... all of theme stand for a source of inspiration towards the development of structurally coloured materials. Study of the firefly abdomen revealed the presence of a 3-layer system comprising the cuticle, the Photogenic layer and then a reflector layer. Microscopy of the reflector layer revealed a granulate structure. Directly inspired from the fire fly Reflector layer, an artificial granulate film composed of hollow silica beads of about 1.05 μm was correlated with a high reflection index and could be used to improve light emission in chemiluminescent systems.

== Artificial enzyme ==
Artificial enzymes are synthetic materials that can mimic (partial) function of a natural enzyme without necessarily being a protein. Among them, some nanomaterials have been used to mimic natural enzymes. These nanomaterials are termed nanozymes. Nanozymes as well as other artificial enzymes have found wide applications, from biosensing and immunoassays, to stem cell growth and pollutant removal.

== Biomimetic composite ==
Biomimetic composites are being made by mimicking natural design strategies. The designs or structures found in animals and plants have been studied and these biological structures are applied to manufacture composite structure. Advanced manufacturing techniques like 3d printing are being used by the researcher to fabricate them.
