= Shuguang Zhang =

American biochemist

- Born: Chongqing, China
- Known for: Self-assembling peptides

Academic background
- Education: University of California, Santa Barbara (Ph.D.); Sichuan University (B.S.)
- Doctoral advisor: Eduardo Orias

Academic work
- Discipline: Biochemistry
- Sub-discipline: Molecular architecture
- Institutions: Massachusetts Institute of Technology
- Website: media.mit.edu/people/shuguang

Shuguang Zhang is an American biochemist. He is at the MIT Media Lab's Laboratory for Molecular Architecture. Shuguang Zhang's research focuses on designs of biological molecules, particularly proteins and peptides. He has published over 210 scientific papers, which have cumulatively been cited over 42,900 times with an h-index of 98. On the "Updated science-wide author databases of standardizes citation indicators", he is ranked 18th worldwide in the field of Biomedical Engineering. Zhang is also a co-founder and board member of Molecular Frontiers Foundation, which organizes annual Molecular Frontiers Symposia in Sweden and around the world. The selected winners are awarded Molecular Frontiers Inquiry Prize.

== Early life and education ==
Shuguang Zhang received his B.S. in biochemistry from Sichuan University in 1980 and Ph.D. in Biochemistry & Molecular Biology from University of California at Santa Barbara in 1988 (under mentorship of Eduardo Orias). The same year, he joined MIT to work with Alexander Rich.

== Career and scientific work ==
=== Self-assembling peptides ===
In 1990, Shuguang Zhang made a serendipitous discovery of a self-assembling peptide in yeast protein Zuotin. This discovery led to the development of a new field of peptide nanobiotechnology and to designs of a variety of self-assembling peptides for widespread uses, including peptide hydrogels in materials science, 3D tissue cell culture and tissue engineering, nanomedicine, sustained molecular releases, clinical and surgical applications. He co-founded a startup company 3DMatrix that brings the self-assembling peptide materials to human clinical for treatment of diabetic ulcers, bedsores (pressure ulcers) and for accelerated wound healings as well as surgical uses. Many self-assembling peptide scaffold hydrogel products have received approvals from the US FDA, European Medicine Agency (EMA), Japan Medical Agency and medical approval agency in Chengdu, China.

=== QTY Code ===
Less widely-known, Zhang invented the QTY Code as a systematic method of rendering insoluble peptide sequences water-soluble, to facilitate biochemical research, while retaining the native conformation and functionality. In 2011, Shuguang Zhang started to design membrane proteins, because there are ~26% of genes that code for membrane proteins in genomes which are crucial for both internal and external cellular communications. He conceived a simple molecular QTY Code, namely Glutamine (Q), Threonine (T) and Tyrosine (Y) to systematically replace the hydrophobic amino acids Leucine (L), Valine (V), Isoleucine (I), and Phenylalanine (F) in the 7 transmembrane alpha-helices of G protein-coupled receptors (GPCRs). Thus, it changes the water-insoluble form of membrane proteins, including GPCRs, into a water-soluble form. The QTY code results suggest that despite 46%-56% transmembrane alpha-helices changes, water-soluble QTY analogs still maintain stable structures and biological function, namely, ligand-binding activities. This simple QTY code is a likely useful tool and has big impact for designs of water-soluble analogs of previously water-insoluble and perhaps aggregated proteins, including amyloids.

The QTY code represents a transformative approach in protein engineering that enables the conversion of hydrophobic membrane proteins into water-soluble functional analogues. The QTY code is a philosophy of protein rewriting which suggests that properties of life (like whether a molecule prefers oil or water) are not fixed, but rather constitute "codes" that can be edited.

== Fellowships and awards ==
- American Cancer Society Postdoctoral Fellow
- Whitaker Foundation Investigator, MIT
- 2006 Guggenheim Fellowship
- Academic sabbatical at University of Cambridge
- 2006 Wilhelm Exner Medal of Austria
- Elected to Austrian Academy of Sciences, 2010
- Elected to American Institute of Medical and Biological Engineering, 2011
- Elected to US National Academy of Inventors, 2013
- 2020 Emil Thomas Kaiser Award from the Protein Society
- Elected to European Academy of Science and Arts, 2021
- Elected honorary fellow, Erwin Schrödinger Society at the Austrian Academy of Sciences, 2021
- 2024 Eva and George Klein Medal of the Karolinska Institute, Stockholm, Sweden
