= Oligopeptide P11-4 =

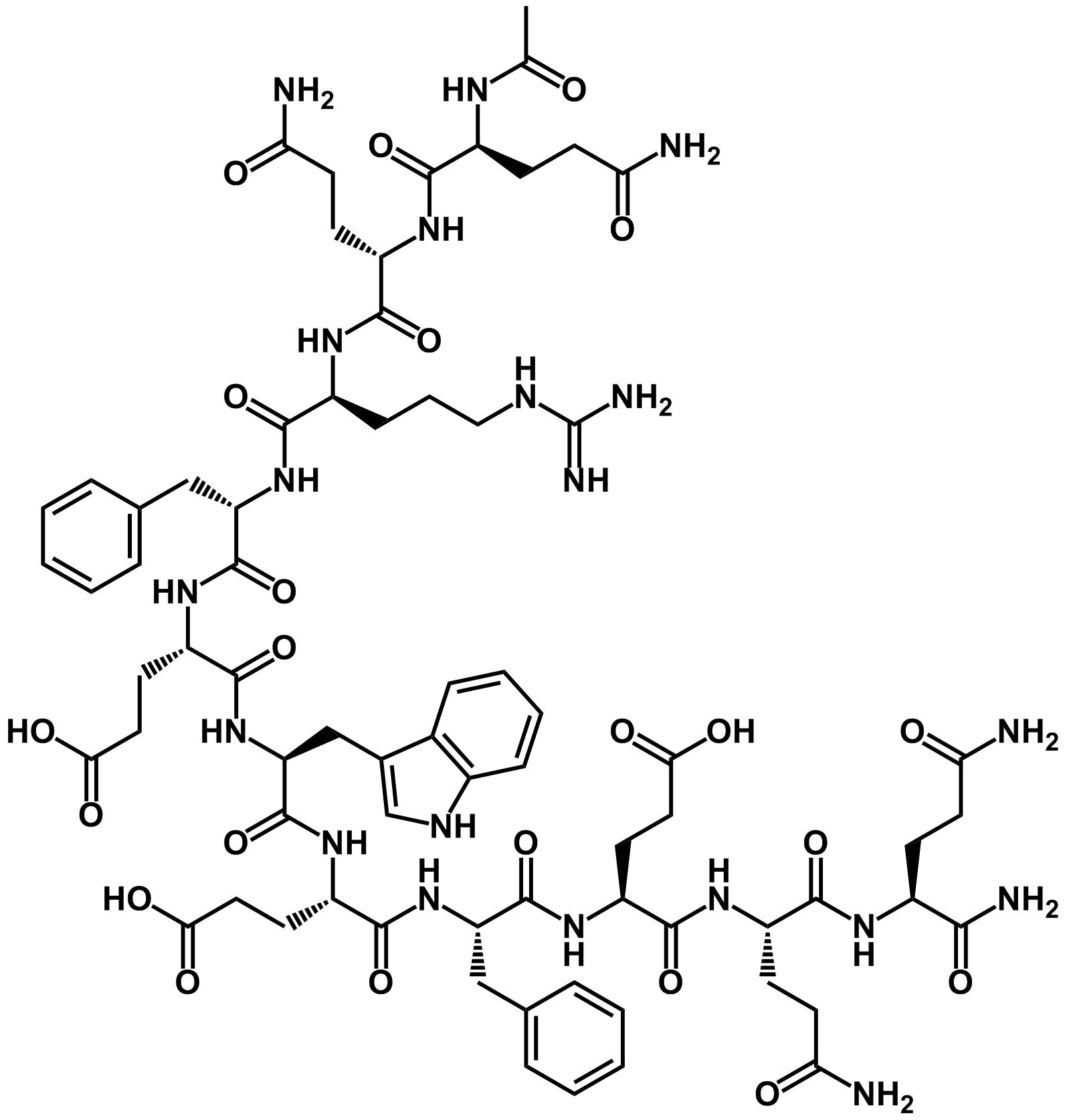

Names
- IUPAC name (4S)-4-[[(2S)-2-[[(2S)-2-[[(2S)-2-[[(2S)-2-[[(2S)-2-[[(2S)-5-carbamimidamido-2-[[(2S)-2-[[(2S)-1,5-dihydroxy-2-(1-hydroxyethylideneamino)-5-iminopentylidene]amino]-1,5-dihydroxy-5-iminopentylidene]amino]-1-hydroxypentylidene]amino]-1-hydroxy-3-phenylpropylidene]amino]-4-carboxy-1-hydroxybutylidene]amino]-1-hydroxy-3-(1H-indol-3-yl)propylidene]amino]-4-carboxy-1-hydroxybutylidene]amino]-1-hydroxy-3-phenylpropylidene]amino]-5-[(2S)-1-[(2S)-1,5-dihydroxy-1,5-diiminopentan-2-yl]imino-1,5-dihydroxy-5-iminopentan-2-yl]imino-5-hydroxypentanoic acid
- Other names: oligopeptide 104 Ac-Gln-Gln-Arg-Phe-Glu-Trp-Glu-Phe-Glu-Gln-Gln-NH2 Ace-QQRFEWEFEQQ-NH2

Identifiers
3D model (JSmol)	Interactive image
ChemSpider	52082515
PubChem CID	101261581
- InChI: InChI=1S/C72H98N20O22/c1-37(93)82-45(19-26-55(74)95)63(106)85-47(21-28-57(76)97)65(108)84-44(17-10-32-80-72(78)79)62(105)90-51(33-38-11-4-2-5-12-38)69(112)88-50(24-31-60(102)103)68(111)92-53(35-40-36-81-42-16-9-8-15-41(40)42)71(114)89-49(23-30-59(100)101)67(110)91-52(34-39-13-6-3-7-14-39)70(113)87-48(22-29-58(98)99)66(109)86-46(20-27-56(75)96)64(107)83-43(61(77)104)18-25-54(73)94/h2-9,11-16,36,43-53,81H,10,17-35H2,1H3,(H2,73,94)(H2,74,95)(H2,75,96)(H2,76,97)(H2,77,104)(H,82,93)(H,83,107)(H,84,108)(H,85,106)(H,86,109)(H,87,113)(H,88,112)(H,89,114)(H,90,105)(H,91,110)(H,92,111)(H,98,99)(H,100,101)(H,102,103)(H4,78,79,80)/t43-,44-,45-,46-,47-,48-,49-,50-,51-,52-,53-/m0/s1 Key: SMSPMXWRKWKZBG-ZOOWYRFPSA-N; InChI=1/C72H98N20O22/c1-37(93)82-45(19-26-55(74)95)63(106)85-47(21-28-57(76)97)65(108)84-44(17-10-32-80-72(78)79)62(105)90-51(33-38-11-4-2-5-12-38)69(112)88-50(24-31-60(102)103)68(111)92-53(35-40-36-81-42-16-9-8-15-41(40)42)71(114)89-49(23-30-59(100)101)67(110)91-52(34-39-13-6-3-7-14-39)70(113)87-48(22-29-58(98)99)66(109)86-46(20-27-56(75)96)64(107)83-43(61(77)104)18-25-54(73)94/h2-9,11-16,36,43-53,81H,10,17-35H2,1H3,(H2,73,94)(H2,74,95)(H2,75,96)(H2,76,97)(H2,77,104)(H,82,93)(H,83,107)(H,84,108)(H,85,106)(H,86,109)(H,87,113)(H,88,112)(H,89,114)(H,90,105)(H,91,110)(H,92,111)(H,98,99)(H,100,101)(H,102,103)(H4,78,79,80)/t43-,44-,45-,46-,47-,48-,49-,50-,51-,52-,53-/m0/s1 Key: SMSPMXWRKWKZBG-ZOOWYRFPBV
- SMILES: CC(=O)N[C@@H](CCC(=O)N)C(=O)N[C@@H](CCC(=O)N)C(=O)N[C@@H](CCCNC(=N)N)C(=O)N[C@@H](Cc1ccccc1)C(=O)N[C@@H](CCC(=O)O)C(=O)N[C@@H](Cc2c[nH]c3c2cccc3)C(=O)N[C@@H](CCC(=O)O)C(=O)N[C@@H](Cc4ccccc4)C(=O)N[C@@H](CCC(=O)O)C(=O)N[C@@H](CCC(=O)N)C(=O)N[C@@H](CCC(=O)N)C(=O)N

Properties
Chemical formula	C_{72}H_{98}N_{20}O_{22}
Molar mass	1595.694 g·mol^{−1}
- Except where otherwise noted, data are given for materials in their standard state (at 25 °C [77 °F], 100 kPa). verify (what is ?) Infobox references

Oligopeptide P11-4 is a synthetic, pH controlled self-assembling peptide used for biomimetic mineralization e.g. for enamel regeneration or as an oral care agent. P11-4 (INCI name Oligopeptide 104) consists of the natural occurring amino acids Glutamine, Glutamic acid, Phenylalanine, Tryptophan and Arginine. The resulting higher molecular structure has a high affinity to tooth mineral. P11-4 has been developed and patented by The University of Leeds (UK). The Swiss company Credentis has licensed the peptide technology and markets it under the trade names including CUROLOX, REGENAMEL, and EMOFLUOR. They offer three products with this technology. As of June 2016 in Switzerland products are available with new Brand names from Dr. Wild & Co AG.

== Mechanism of action ==
P11-4 is an α-peptide that self-assembles into β-sheet amyloids with a hydrogel appearance at low pH. It builds a 3-D bio-matrix with binding sites for calcium ions serving as nucleation point for hydroxyapatite (tooth mineral) formation. The high affinity to tooth mineral is based on matching distances of Ca-ion binding sites on P11-4 and Ca spacing in the crystal lattice of hydroxyapatite. The matrix formation is pH controlled and thus allows control matrix activity and place of formation.

== P11-4 in dental applications ==
Self assembling properties of P11-4 are used to regenerate early caries lesions. By application of P11-4 on the tooth surface, the peptide diffuse through the intact hypomineralized plate into the early caries lesion body and start, due to the low pH in such a lesion, to self-assemble generating a peptide scaffold mimicking the enamel matrix. Around the newly formed matrix de-novo enamel-crystals are formed from calcium phosphate present in saliva. Through the remineralization caries activity is significantly reduced in comparison with a fluoride treatment alone. In aqueous oral care gels the peptide is present as matrix. It binds directly as matrix to the tooth mineral and forms a stable layer on the teeth. This layer does protect the teeth from acid attacks. It also occludes open dentin tubules and thus reduces the dental sensitivity.

== Uses ==
- Treatment of initial caries lesions
- Regenerating enamel
- Dentin hypersensitivity
- Acid protection

== Availability ==
Availability of products containing P11-4 vary by country, with some products available only to dentists, and others available to the retail public.

Medical device for caries treatment and enamel regeneration:

- CURODONT REPAIR (EU)
- REGENAMEL (CH)

Cosmetic products for acid protection and dentin desensitization:

- CURODONT PROTECT (EU)
- EMOFLUOR PROTECT GEL PROFESSIONAL (CH)
- CURODONT D'SENZ (EU & CH)
- EMOFLUOR DESENS GEL PROFESSIONAL (CH)
- Candida Protect Professional (CH)

== See also ==
- Amorphous calcium phosphate (Recaldent)
- Remineralisation of teeth
- Oligopeptide
- Biomimetic materials
- Fluoride
