= Nano neuro knitting =

Nano neuro knitting is an emerging technology for repairing nervous system tissues via nano scaffolding techniques. Currently being explored in numerous research endeavors, nano neuro knitting has been shown to allow partial reinnervation in damaged areas of the nervous system through the interactions between potentially regenerative axons and peptide scaffolds. This interaction has been shown to lead to sufficient axon density renewal to the point that functionality is restored. While nano neuro knitting shows promise, the uncertainty of the effects in human subjects warrants further investigation before clinical trials initiate.

== Mechanism ==
The process of nano neuro knitting for nervous system tissue repair is carried out by engineering nanostructures for use as neural prosthetics and scaffolding in the brain. The nano neuro knitting process is two-fold. Firstly, the nanostructure is constructed. This entails creating electrospun nanofibers that are combined with self-assembling peptides, molecules made up of amino acids that spontaneously form into nanostructures. Electrospun nanofibers are commonly used in tissue grafts as they resemble natural tissue and are easy to fabricate. Peptide-based nanomaterials are used due to their highly permissive nature which creates an easily attachable landscape for nerve-cells. Scaffolds using a silk fibroin peptide (SF16) have also shown promise in nerve repair due to silk's biologically compatibility composition and mechanical features. Secondly, these nanostructures are transplanted into the area where tissue damage has occurred. Repairing damaged tissue in the nervous system using engineered nanofibers is a way of knitting damaged tissue back together. The main goal is to create a supplemental structure that imitates the body's natural connective tissue. This synthetic extracellular matrix works to fill in the gaps between damaged tissue sites, promoting axon regrowth and the return of normal neurological function.

== Potential applications ==
Scaffolds produced using nanotechnology have enabled researchers to investigate clinically relevant applications that involve the promotion of tissue regeneration at sites of acute damage. In nano neuro knitting, these methods are applied specifically to the repair of tissues of the nervous system.

== Research and outlook ==
=== Ophthalmic applications ===
Nano neuro knitting has been researched for ophthalmic applications. The Massachusetts Institute of Technology (MIT) has tested a self-assembling peptide nanofiber scaffold (SAPNS) on hamsters to repair optic tract damage. Following injection, axon regeneration repaired the hamsters’ transected superior colliculi and restored vision in the tested animals.

The mechanism behind the regeneration observed in these hamster models has been proposed to involve local axons with the potential to regenerate, the surrounding extracellular matrix (ECM), and the peptides of the nano scaffold. It has been shown that nano scaffolds can be carefully constructed to promote axonal growth and prevent scar formation at lesion sites. Using alternating positive and negative L-amino acids to form β-sheet ionic self-complementary peptides, nanofibers of the SAPNSs mimic the environment of the ECM and have been shown to serve as effective scaffolds in both in vitro and in vivo studies—appearing to be immunologically inert, feasibly excreted, and nontoxic to biological systems. Whereas previous research has attempted to graft nerve tissue to the optic tract and resulted in complications (leg disabilities in the case of sciatic nerve grafts, for instance), nano neuro knitting has been shown to promote the regeneration of these tissues without such drawbacks. While more research is required in order to understand how this technology works, scientists propose that SAPNSs either facilitate this neuroregeneration by promoting cell migration into the lesion area or bringing the lesion areas in closer proximity via contraction.

=== Central nervous system obstacles ===
One obstacle for drug delivery to the brain is the blood-brain barrier (BBB). The small size of nanomaterials, however, allows nanotechnologies to pass through. The scaffolds that enable nano neuro knitting, hence, are able to bypass this boundary without affecting the BBB that serves the essential role of managing what can and cannot enter and leave the central nervous system (CNS). While nano neuro knitting and other nanotechnologies may eventually replace procedures currently used to repair damage to the CNS through their improved biodistribution and pharmacokinetics, the toxicity and long-term impacts of nanomaterial exposure in humans has yet to be sufficiently assessed. While some studies demonstrate no immediate toxicity and immune responses, it has yet to be determined if this holds true for the human CNS (with particular concern for the retention of these materials in the brain and their capacity to form neurotoxic plaques) and the rest of the body's systems over time. Fortunately, SAPNSs may breakdown naturally by peptidase activity.

In addition, promising monitoring methods are being explored in order to monitor axon regeneration in vivo that would provide patients real-time feedback via manganese-enhanced magnetic resonance imaging (MEMRI). In this way, these potential therapies could be monitored efficiently.

=== Spinal cord injury repair ===
Spinal cord injuries (SCIs) cause damage to the nervous system, which can result in neurological disfunction. The main barrier to recovery from a SCI arises from the absence of tissue regeneration ability, specifically in damage to a portion of the nerve cell called the axon. Damage to the spinal cord can result in irreversible deficiencies including paralysis and loss of sensation.

As in ophthalmic applications, research has demonstrated that nano scaffolds may be an effective tool for repairing spinal cord injuries (SCIs). Such studies have utilized rat models to show that electrospun nanofibers and SAPNSs can effectively serve as guidance channels for regeneration of neural tissue lost at sites of SCI. Using these scaffolds with integrated, slowly-released proregenerative cytokines showed that SCI rat models could repair contused spinal cord tissue. After six months, the spinal cord cysts were shown to be replaced by bundles of myelinated axons, ECM, and vascularization. In addition, the rat models have been shown to regain motor control after this treatment.

Studies also suggest that culturing Schwann cells (SCs) and neural progenitor cells (NPCs) in SAPNSs prior to transplantation can significantly improve SCI repair by promoting axon and blood vessel development in the scaffold which has been shown to connect damaged tissue back together.
