= Qty =

Qty or QTY may refer to:

- Quantity, property that can exist as a multitude or magnitude
- QTY (band), American indie rock band
- QTY code, a design method to transform membrane proteins
