= QTY Code =

Design method for proteins

The QTY Code is a design method to transform membrane proteins that are intrinsically insoluble in water into variants with water solubility, while retaining their structure and function.

== Invention ==
Shuguang Zhang invented the QTY Code as a systematic method of rendering insoluble peptide sequences water-soluble, to facilitate biochemical research, while retaining the native conformation and functionality. In 2011, Shuguang Zhang started to design membrane proteins, because there are ~26% of genes that code for membrane proteins in genomes which are crucial for both internal and external cellular communications. He conceived a simple molecular QTY Code, namely Glutamine (Q), Threonine (T) and Tyrosine (Y) to systematically replace the hydrophobic amino acids Leucine (L), Valine (V), Isoleucine (I), and Phenylalanine (F) in the 7 transmembrane alpha-helices of G protein-coupled receptors (GPCRs). Thus, it changes the water-insoluble form of membrane proteins, including GPCRs, into a water-soluble form. The QTY code results suggest that despite 46%-56% transmembrane alpha-helices changes, water-soluble QTY analogs still maintain stable structures and biological function, namely, ligand-binding activities. This simple QTY code is a likely useful tool and has big impact for designs of water-soluble analogs of previously water-insoluble and perhaps aggregated proteins, including amyloids.

The QTY code represents a transformative approach in protein engineering that enables the conversion of hydrophobic membrane proteins into water-soluble functional analogues. The QTY code is a philosophy of protein rewriting which suggests that properties of life (like whether a molecule prefers oil or water) are not fixed, but rather constitute "codes" that can be edited.

== Similar structures of amino acids ==
The QTY Code is based on two key molecular structural facts: 1) all 20 natural amino acids are found in alpha-helices regardless of their chemical properties, although some amino acids have a higher propensity to form an alpha-helix; and, 2) several amino acids share striking structural similarities despite their very different chemical properties. These may be paired as: Glutamine (Q) vs Leucine (L); Threonine (T) vs Valine (V) and Isoleucine (I); and Tyrosine (Y) vs Phenylalanine (F).

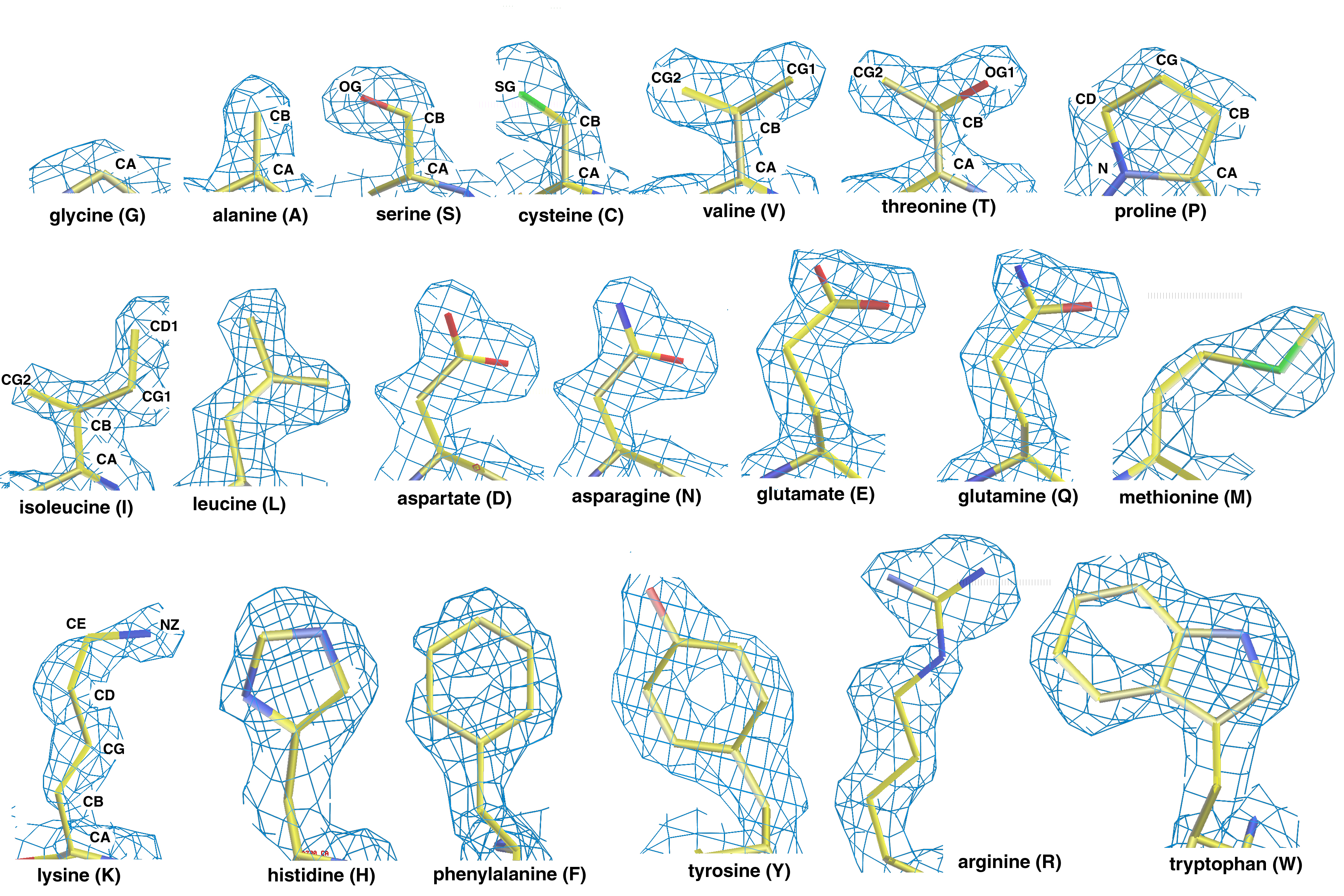
Shapes of the 20 natural amino acids as they appear in an experimental electron density map at 1.5 angstrom resolution.

The QTY Code systematically replaces water-insoluble amino acids (L, V, I and F) with water-soluble amino acids (Q, T and Y) in transmembrane alpha-helices. Thus, its application to membrane proteins changes the water-insoluble form of membrane proteins into water-soluble variants. The QTY Code was specifically conceived to render G protein-coupled receptors (GPCRs) into a water-soluble form. Despite substantial transmembrane domain changes, the QTY variants of GPCRs maintain stable structure and ligand binding activities.

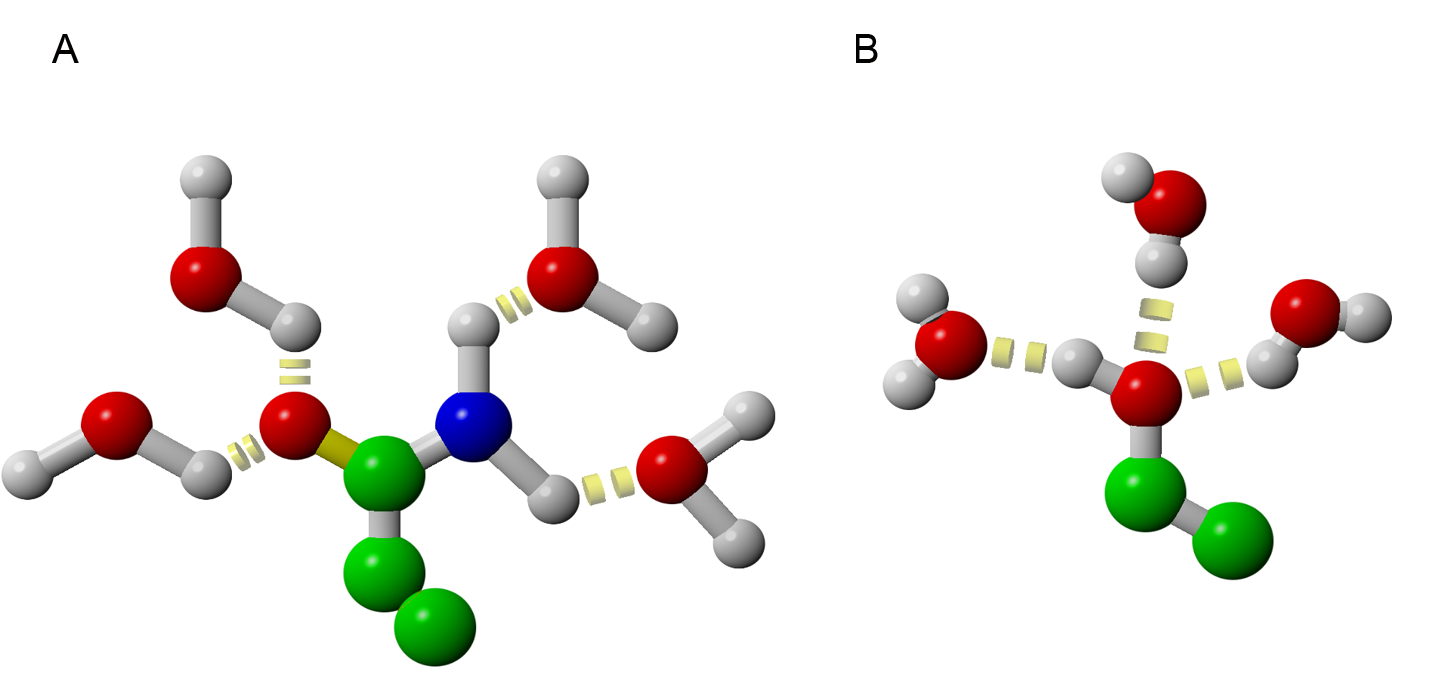
Hydrogen bond interactions between water and the amino acids (Courtesy of Michael Skuhersky, MIT)

=== Hydrogen bond interactions between water and the amino acids ===
The side chain of glutamine (Q) can form 4 hydrogen bonds with 4 water molecules. There are 2 hydrogen donors from nitrogen and 2 hydrogen acceptors for oxygen. The –OH group of threonine (T) and tyrosine (Y) can form 3 hydrogen bonds with 3 water molecules (2 H-acceptors and 1 H-donor). Color code: Green = carbon, red = oxygen, blue = nitrogen, gray = hydrogen, yellow disks = hydrogen bonds.

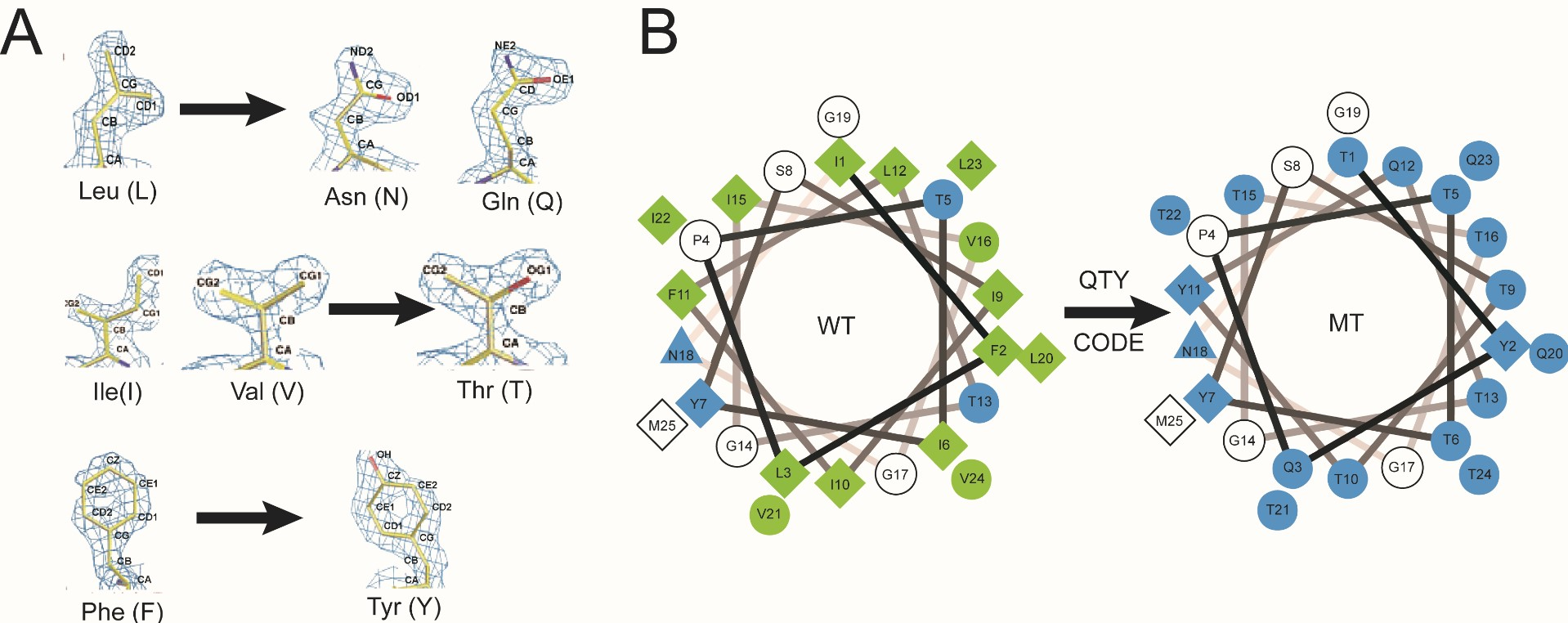
Illustration of the QTY Code.

=== Three types of alpha-helices and with nearly identical molecular structure ===
There are 3 types of alpha-helices and with nearly identical molecular structure, namely: a) 1.5Å per amino acid rise, b) 100˚ per amino acid turn, c) 3.6 amino acids and 360˚ per helical turn, and d) 5.4Å per helical turn. The 3 types of alpha-helices are: 1) mostly hydrophobic amino acids including Leucine (L), Isoleucine (I), Valine (V), Phenylalanine (F), Methionine (M) and Alanine (A) that are commonly found as the helical transmembrane segments in membrane proteins; 2) mostly hydrophilic amino acids including Aspartic acid (D), Glutamic acid (E), Glutamine (Q), Lysine (K), Arginine (R), Serine (S), Threonine (T), Tyrosine (Y) that are commonly found on the out layer in water-soluble globular proteins; 3) mixed hydrophobic and hydrophilic amino acids that are partitioned in 2 faces: hydrophobic face and hydrophilic face, in an analogy, like our fingers with front and back. These alpha-helices sometimes attach to surface of membrane lipid bilayer, or partially buried to the hydrophobic core and partially close to the surface of water-soluble globular proteins.

== The QTY code ==
The QTY Code is likely universally applicable and also reversible, namely, Q changes to L, T changes to V and I, and Y changes to F. The QTY Code has been successful in designing many water-soluble variants of chemokine receptors and cytokine receptors. The QTY Code may likely be successfully applied to other water-insoluble aggregated proteins. The QTY Code is robust and straightforward: it is the simplest tool to carry out membrane protein design without sophisticated computer algorithms. Thus, it can be used broadly. The QTY Code has implications for designing additional GPCRs and other membrane proteins including cytokine receptors that are directly involved in cytokine storm syndrome.

The QTY Code has also been applied to cytokine receptor water-soluble variants with the aim of combatting the cytokine storm syndrome (also called cytokine release syndrome) suffered by cancer patients receiving CAR-T therapy. This therapeutic application may be equally applicable to severely infected COVID-19 patients, for whom cytokine storms often lead to death.
