= Adenosine deaminase z-alpha domain =

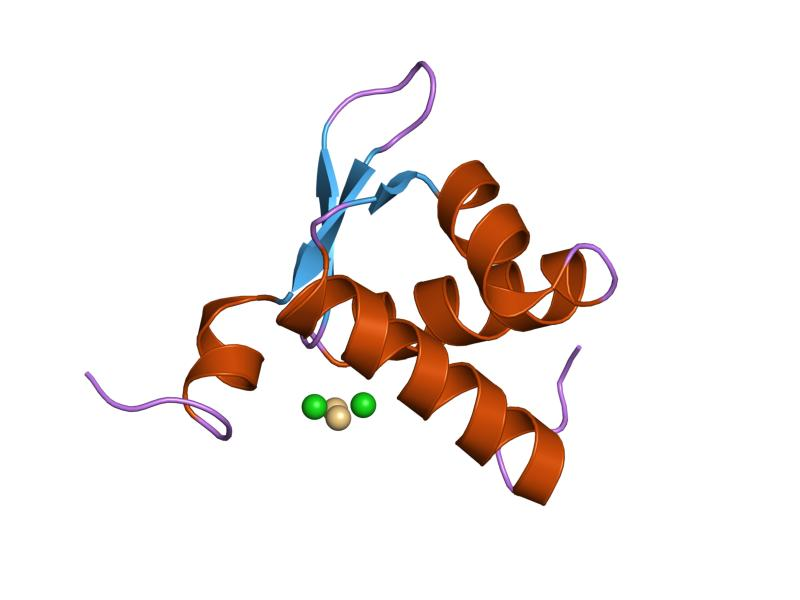
- Crystal structure of the zb domain from the RNA editing enzyme ADAR1

Identifiers
- Symbol: z-alpha
- Pfam: PF02295
- Pfam clan: CL0123
- InterPro: IPR000607
- SCOP2: 1qgp / SCOPe / SUPFAM
Available protein structures:
- PDB: IPR000607 PF02295 (ECOD; PDBsum)
- AlphaFold: IPR000607; PF02295

In molecular biology, the protein domain Adenosine deaminase z-alpha domain refers to an evolutionary conserved protein domain. This family consists of the N-terminus and thus the z-alpha domain of double-stranded RNA-specific adenosine deaminase (ADAR), an RNA-editing enzyme. The z-alpha domain is a Z-DNA binding domain, and binding of this region to B-DNA has been shown to be disfavoured by steric hindrance.

== Function ==
Double-stranded RNA-specific adenosine deaminase (EC) converts multiple adenosines to inosines and creates I/U mismatched base pairs in double-helical RNA substrates without apparent sequence specificity. DRADA has been found to modify adenosines in AU-rich regions more frequently, probably due to the relative ease of melting A/U base pairs compared to G/C base pairs. The protein functions to modify viral RNA genomes, and may be responsible for hypermutation of certain negative-stranded viruses. DRADA edits the mRNAs for the glutamate receptor subunits by site-selective adenosine deamination. The DRADA repeat is also found in viral E3 proteins, which contain a double-stranded RNA-binding domain.

The Z-alpha domain is characteristic of the interferon-inducible p150 isoform of ADAR1. It targets the enzyme to endogenous Z-RNA structures, such as those formed by Alu elements; this editing is required to prevent the innate immune sensor MDA5 from triggering an interferon response.

== Clinical significance ==
Mutations in the Z-alpha domain of ADAR1 are a cause of Aicardi-Goutières syndrome (AGS), an inflammatory encephalopathy associated with high levels of interferon-alpha. Specific mutations such as P193A and N173S result in Aicardi-Goutières syndrome type 6 (AGS6) because the failure to edit self-RNA triggers a type I interferon signature.

== Examples ==
Genes encoding proteins containing this domain include ADAR and ZBP1.
