= Ectonucleoside triphosphate diphosphohydrolase 4 =

Protein-coding gene in the species Homo sapiens

ENTPD4

Identifiers
- Aliases: ENTPD4, LALP70, LAP70, LYSAL1, NTPDase-4, UDPase, ectonucleoside triphosphate diphosphohydrolase 4
- External IDs: OMIM: 607577; MGI: 5435040; GeneCards: ENTPD4
Enzyme activity
EC #	BRENDA	ExPASy	KEGG	MetaCyc
3.6.1.6	↗	↗	↗	↗
3.6.1.15	↗	↗	↗	↗
3.6.1.42	↗	↗	↗	↗

Gene location (Human)
Chr.	Chromosome 8 (human)
Band	8p21.3	Start	23,385,783 bp
Band	8p21.3	End	23,457,695 bp

Gene location (Mouse)
Chr.	Chromosome 14 (mouse)
Band	14 D2|14	Start	69,792,873 bp
Band	14 D2|14	End	69,822,969 bp
RNA expression pattern
Bgee	Human / Mouse (ortholog); Top expressed in: Brodmann area 23; middle temporal gyrus; tibia; endothelial cell; lateral nuclear group of thalamus; postcentral gyrus; Brodmann area 46; orbitofrontal cortex; tonsil; palpebral conjunctiva / Top expressed in: proximal tubule; quadriceps femoris muscle; spermatocyte; adrenal gland; skeletal muscle tissue; human kidney; right kidney; muscle of thigh; urinary bladder; spermatid; More reference expression data
BioGPS	n/a
Gene ontology
Molecular function	hydrolase activity; uridine-diphosphatase activity; nucleoside-diphosphatase activity; nucleoside-triphosphatase activity
Cellular component	membrane; cytoplasmic vesicle; integral component of Golgi membrane; Golgi apparatus; autophagosome membrane; integral component of membrane; Golgi membrane; integral component of autophagosome membrane
Biological process	UDP catabolic process; nucleobase-containing small molecule catabolic process; metabolism
Sources:Amigo / QuickGO
Orthologs
Databases	NCBI: entry; OMA: entry
Species	Human	Mouse
Entrez	9583	100862375
Ensembl	ENSG00000197217	ENSMUSG00000022066
UniProt	Q9Y227; Q8NE73	Q9DBT4
RefSeq (mRNA)	NM_004901; NM_001128930	NM_001359159; NM_001359160
RefSeq (protein)	NP_001122402; NP_004892	NP_080450; NP_001347281
Location (UCSC)	Chr 8: 23.39 – 23.46 Mb	Chr 14: 69.79 – 69.82 Mb
PubMed search
- Wikidata
View/Edit Human	View/Edit Mouse

Ectonucleoside triphosphate diphosphohydrolase 4 is a protein that in humans is encoded by the ENTPD4 gene.

== Function ==
This gene encodes a member of the apyrase protein family. Apyrases are enzymes that catalyze the hydrolysis of nucleotide diphosphates and triphosphates in a calcium or magnesium ion-dependent manner. The encoded protein is an endo-apyrase and may play a role in salvaging nucleotides from lysosomes. Alternatively spliced transcript variants encoding multiple isoforms have been observed for this gene, and these isoforms may differ in divalent cation dependence and substrate specificity. [provided by RefSeq, Sep 2011].
