= Guanosine-diphosphatase =

Class of enzymes

Identifiers
- EC no.: 3.6.1.42
- CAS no.: 98037-56-0

Databases
- BRENDA: enzyme data
- ExPASy: NiceZyme view
- KEGG: enzyme entry
- MetaCyc: metabolic pathway
- Rhea: reactions
- PDB structures: RCSB PDB PDBe PDBsum
- Gene Ontology: AmiGO / QuickGO
Search
- PMC: articles
- PubMed: articles
- NCBI: proteins

Guanosine-diphosphatase (EC 3.6.1.42) is an enzyme characterised from calf liver and yeast that catalyzes the hydrolysis of guanosine diphosphate to guanosine monophosphate and orthophosphate (P_{i}):

guanosine diphosphate
H_{2}O
P_{i}
guanosine monophosphate

In plants, the enzyme acts as a type of apyrase, by removing terminal phosphate groups from nucleoside triphosphates or diphosphates, and hence maintain the ratio between them. In mammals it assists in providing nucleotide sugars to the Golgi apparatus.

This enzyme is classified aas a hydrolase, specifically one acting on acid anhydrides in phosphorus-containing anhydrides. The systematic name of this enzyme class is GDP phosphohydrolase. This enzyme is also called GDPase.
