= Z-RNA =

Z-RNA is a left-handed alternative conformation for the RNA double helix. Just like for Z-DNA, Z-RNA is favored by a sequence composed of Purine/Pyrimidine repeats and especially CG repeats.

== Discovery ==
The ability of dsRNA to convert into a left-handed helix was demonstrated using NMR and circular dichroism in 1984. This conversion was shown to require high ionic strength and elevated temperatures (35 degrees).

== Structural characteristics ==
Z-RNA to resemble, but not be identical, to that of Z-DNA. The structure of the complex of a Zalpha domain with Z-RNA under close to physiological salt concentrations however suggests a structure much closer to the Z-DNA conformation and points to two forms of Z-RNA (low and high salt conformations)

== Role in biology ==
Formation of Z-RNA in living cells was suggested by experiments using anti-Z-RNA antibodies to stain fixed protozoan cells Further evidence accrued with the discovery that the Zalpha domain of the RNA editing enzyme ADAR1 binds and recognizes with high affinity Z-RNA. Structural features of the recognition of Z-RNA by Zalpha domains were revealed by the crystallographic study of the complex
