= Nucleoside-diphosphatase =

Group of proteins having nucleoside-diphosphatase activity

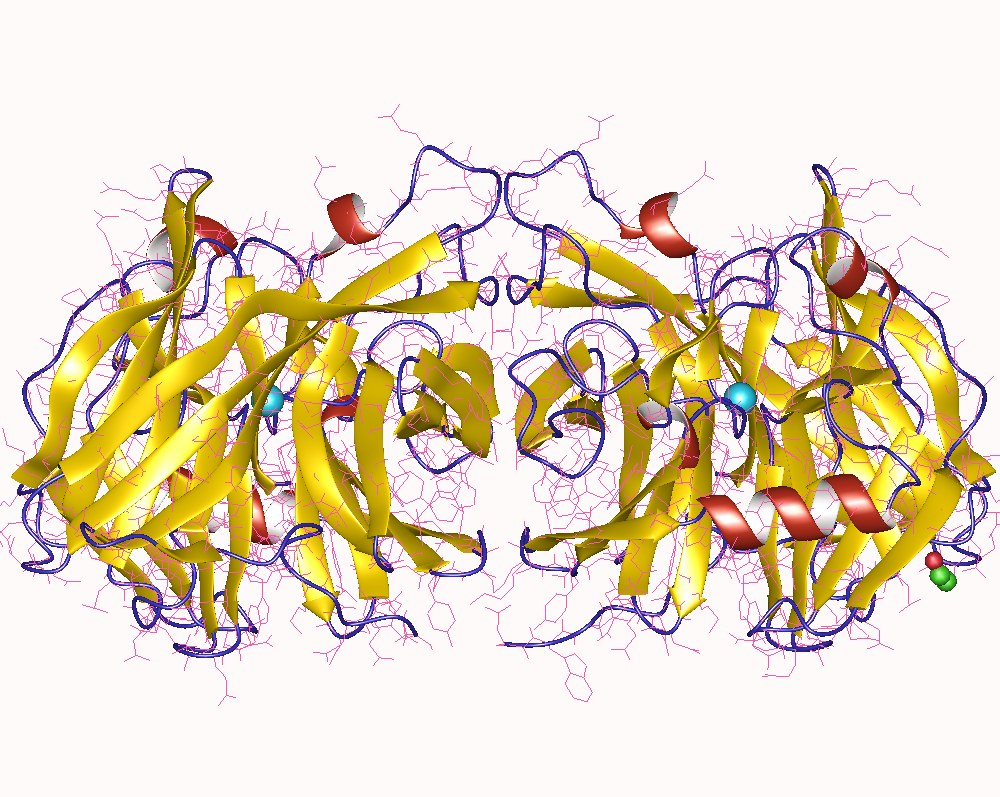
- Nucleoside-diphosphatase dimer, Human

Identifiers
- EC no.: 3.6.1.6
- CAS no.: 9027-69-4

Databases
- BRENDA: enzyme data
- ExPASy: NiceZyme view
- KEGG: enzyme entry
- MetaCyc: metabolic pathway
- Rhea: reactions
- PDB structures: RCSB PDB PDBe PDBsum
- Gene Ontology: AmiGO / QuickGO
Search
- PMC: articles
- PubMed: articles
- NCBI: proteins

Nucleoside-diphosphatases (EC 3.6.1.6) are a type of enzyme that catalyze the general chemical reaction:

a ribonucleoside diphosphate + H_{2}O $\rightleftharpoons$ a nucleotide + phosphate

For example, the enzyme hydrolyses uridine diphosphate to uridine monophosphate and orthophosphate (P_{i}):

uridine diphosphate
H_{2}O
P_{i}
uridine monophosphate

These enzymes are hydrolases, specifically of the type acting on acid anhydrides in phosphorus-containing anhydride. In humans, this type of activity is found in the enzymes CANT1, ENTPD4, ENTPD5, and ENTPD6.

== Nomenclature ==
The systematic name of this enzyme class is nucleoside-diphosphate phosphohydrolase. Other names include thiamine pyrophosphatase, UDPase, inosine diphosphatase, adenosine diphosphatase, IDPase, ADPase, adenosinepyrophosphatase, guanosine diphosphatase, guanosine 5'-diphosphatase, inosine 5'-diphosphatase, uridine diphosphatase, uridine 5'-diphosphatase, nucleoside diphosphate phosphatase, type B nucleoside diphosphatase, GDPase, CDPase, nucleoside 5'-diphosphatase, type L nucleoside diphosphatase, NDPase, and nucleoside diphosphate phosphohydrolase.

== Structural studies ==
As of late 2007, two structures have been solved for this class of enzymes, with PDB accession codes PDB: 2H2N and PDB: 2H2U.
