= Macrophage-capping protein =

Protein-coding gene in the species Homo sapiens

CAPG
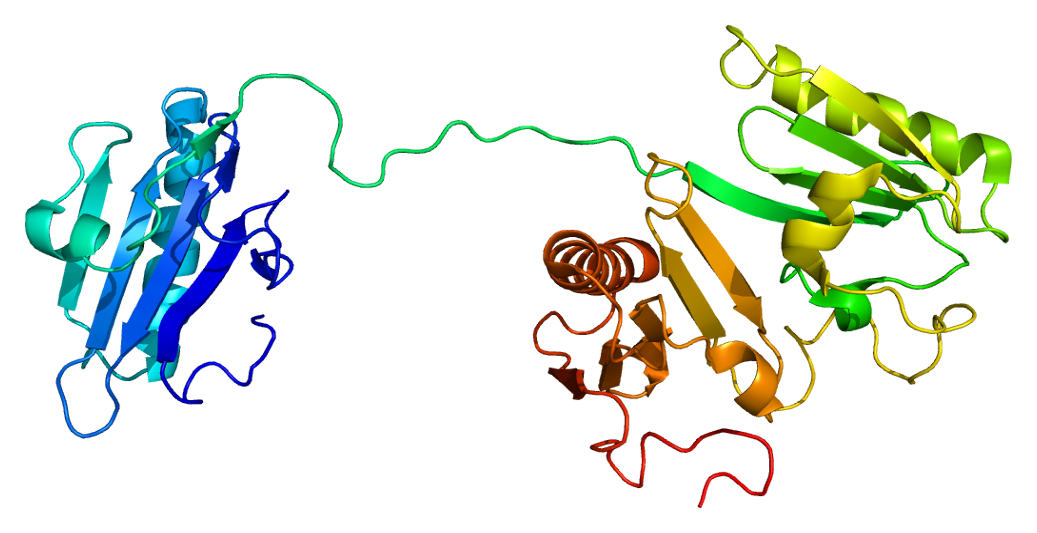

Identifiers
- Aliases: CAPG, AFCP, HEL-S-66, MCP, capping actin protein, gelsolin like
- External IDs: OMIM: 153615; MGI: 1098259; GeneCards: CAPG
Available structures
PDB	Ortholog search: PDBe RCSB
PDB	List of PDB id codes 1J72, 1JHW

Gene location (Human)
Chr.	Chromosome 2 (human)
Band	2p11.2	Start	85,394,753 bp
Band	2p11.2	End	85,418,432 bp

Gene location (Mouse)
Chr.	Chromosome 6 (mouse)
Band	6|6 C1	Start	72,521,374 bp
Band	6|6 C1	End	72,539,966 bp
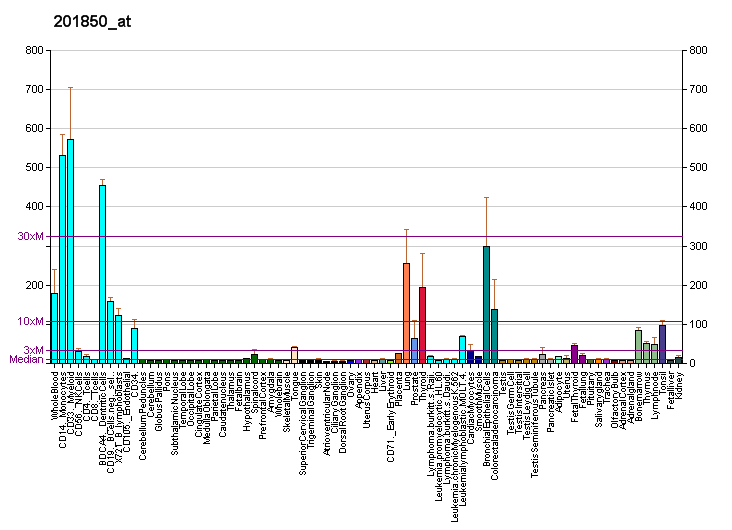
RNA expression pattern
Bgee	Human / Mouse (ortholog); Top expressed in: monocyte; skin of abdomen; left lobe of thyroid gland; granulocyte; right lobe of thyroid gland; skin of leg; upper lobe of left lung; right lung; ectocervix; gums / Top expressed in: granulocyte; corneal stroma; lip; decidua; ankle joint; conjunctival fornix; esophagus; stroma of bone marrow; gastrula; ankle; More reference expression data
BioGPS	More reference expression data
Gene ontology
Molecular function	protein-containing complex binding; actin binding; protein binding; protein domain specific binding; cadherin binding; actin filament binding
Cellular component	cytoplasm; F-actin capping protein complex; melanosome; centriole; mitotic spindle; nucleolus; extracellular exosome; nucleus; Flemming body; nucleoplasm; extracellular region; ruffle; lamellipodium; cell projection
Biological process	barbed-end actin filament capping; extracellular matrix disassembly; positive regulation of podosome assembly; actin filament capping; protein-containing complex assembly
Sources:Amigo / QuickGO
Orthologs
Databases	NCBI: entry; OMA: entry
Species	Human	Mouse
Entrez	822	12332
Ensembl	ENSG00000042493	ENSMUSG00000056737
UniProt	P40121	P24452
RefSeq (mRNA)	NM_001256139; NM_001256140; NM_001747; NM_001320732; NM_001320733 NM_001320734	NM_001042534; NM_001271395; NM_001271415; NM_007599
RefSeq (protein)	NP_001243068; NP_001243069; NP_001307661; NP_001307662; NP_001307663 NP_001738	n/a
Location (UCSC)	Chr 2: 85.39 – 85.42 Mb	Chr 6: 72.52 – 72.54 Mb
PubMed search
- Wikidata
View/Edit Human	View/Edit Mouse

Macrophage-capping protein (CAPG) also known as actin regulatory protein CAP-G is a protein that in humans is encoded by the CAPG gene.

== Function ==
This gene encodes a member of the gelsolin/villin family of actin-regulatory proteins. The encoded protein reversibly blocks the barbed ends of F-actin filaments in a Ca2+ and phosphoinositide-regulated manner, but does not sever preformed actin filaments. By capping the barbed ends of actin filaments, the encoded protein contributes to the control of actin-based motility in non-muscle cells. Alternatively, spliced transcript variants have been observed, but have not been fully described.
