= EDIL3 =

Protein-coding gene in the species Homo sapiens

Available structures
PDB	Ortholog search: PDBe RCSB
PDB	List of PDB id codes 4D90

Identifiers
- Aliases: EDIL3, DEL1, EGF like repeats and discoidin domains 3
- External IDs: OMIM: 606018; MGI: 1329025; HomoloGene: 21166; GeneCards: EDIL3; OMA:EDIL3 - orthologs

Gene location (Human)
Chr.	Chromosome 5 (human)
Band	5q14.3	Start	83,940,554 bp
Band	5q14.3	End	84,384,880 bp

Gene location (Mouse)
Chr.	Chromosome 13 (mouse)
Band	13|13 C3	Start	88,969,591 bp
Band	13|13 C3	End	89,471,342 bp
RNA expression pattern
Bgee	Human / Mouse (ortholog); Top expressed in: external globus pallidus; inferior ganglion of vagus nerve; pars reticulata; subthalamic nucleus; tibia; pars compacta; superior vestibular nucleus; pons; lateral nuclear group of thalamus; ventral tegmental area / Top expressed in: lateral geniculate nucleus; medial geniculate nucleus; medial dorsal nucleus; anterior horn of spinal cord; globus pallidus; calvaria; deep cerebellar nuclei; ventral tegmental area; lateral hypothalamus; suprachiasmatic nucleus; More reference expression data
BioGPS	n/a
Gene ontology
Molecular function	calcium ion binding; integrin binding; metal ion binding; extracellular matrix structural constituent
Cellular component	extracellular vesicle; extracellular region; extracellular exosome; extracellular matrix; collagen-containing extracellular matrix
Biological process	multicellular organism development; cell adhesion; positive regulation of cell-substrate adhesion
Sources:Amigo / QuickGO
Orthologs
Species	Human	Mouse
Entrez	10085	13612
Ensembl	ENSG00000164176	ENSMUSG00000034488
UniProt	O43854	O35474
RefSeq (mRNA)	NM_001278642; NM_005711	NM_001037987; NM_010103
RefSeq (protein)	NP_001265571; NP_005702	NP_001033076; NP_034233
Location (UCSC)	Chr 5: 83.94 – 84.38 Mb	Chr 13: 88.97 – 89.47 Mb
PubMed search
- Wikidata
View/Edit Human	View/Edit Mouse

EGF like repeats and discoidin domains 3 is a protein that in humans is encoded by the EDIL3 gene.

== Function ==
The protein encoded by this gene is an integrin ligand. It plays an important role in mediating angiogenesis and may be important in vessel wall remodeling and development. It also influences endothelial cell behavior.
