= ENTPD3 =

Protein-coding gene in the species Homo sapiens

Identifiers
- Aliases: ENTPD3, CD39L3, HB6, NTPDase-3, ectonucleoside triphosphate diphosphohydrolase 3
- External IDs: OMIM: 603161; MGI: 1321386; GeneCards: ENTPD3
Enzyme activity
EC #	BRENDA	ExPASy	KEGG	MetaCyc
3.6.1.5	↗	↗	↗	↗

Gene location (Human)
Chr.	Chromosome 3 (human)
Band	3p22.1	Start	40,387,184 bp
Band	3p22.1	End	40,428,744 bp

Gene location (Mouse)
Chr.	Chromosome 9 (mouse)
Band	9|9 F4	Start	120,368,884 bp
Band	9|9 F4	End	120,397,393 bp
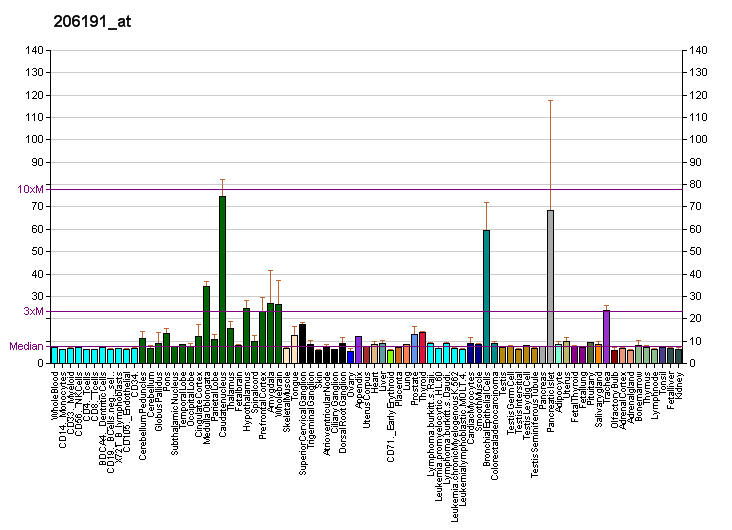
RNA expression pattern
Bgee	Human / Mouse (ortholog); Top expressed in: islet of Langerhans; periodontal fiber; middle temporal gyrus; parotid gland; putamen; nasal epithelium; tibia; caudate nucleus; minor salivary glands; decidua / Top expressed in: molar; islet of Langerhans; vestibular membrane of cochlear duct; facial skeleton; transitional epithelium of urinary bladder; body of femur; lesser wing of sphenoid bone; membranous bone; Dermatocranium; lumbar spinal ganglion; More reference expression data
BioGPS	More reference expression data
Gene ontology
Molecular function	nucleotide binding; protein binding; hydrolase activity; ATP binding; nucleoside-diphosphatase activity; nucleoside-triphosphatase activity
Cellular component	integral component of membrane; membrane; plasma membrane
Biological process	nucleoside triphosphate catabolic process; nucleoside diphosphate catabolic process; nucleobase-containing small molecule catabolic process
Sources:Amigo / QuickGO
Orthologs
Databases	NCBI: entry; OMA: entry
Species	Human	Mouse
Entrez	956	215446
Ensembl	ENSG00000168032	ENSMUSG00000041608
UniProt	O75355	Q8BFW6
RefSeq (mRNA)	NM_001248; NM_001291960; NM_001291961	NM_178676
RefSeq (protein)	NP_001239; NP_001278889; NP_001278890	NP_848791
Location (UCSC)	Chr 3: 40.39 – 40.43 Mb	Chr 9: 120.37 – 120.4 Mb
PubMed search
- Wikidata
View/Edit Human	View/Edit Mouse

Ectonucleoside triphosphate diphosphohydrolase 3 is an enzyme that in humans is encoded by the ENTPD3 gene.

ENTPD3 is similar to E-type nucleotidases (NTPases). NTPases, such as CD39, mediate catabolism of extracellular nucleotides. ENTPD3 contains 4 apyrase-conserved regions which is characteristic of NTPases.
