= CANT1 =

Protein-coding gene in humans

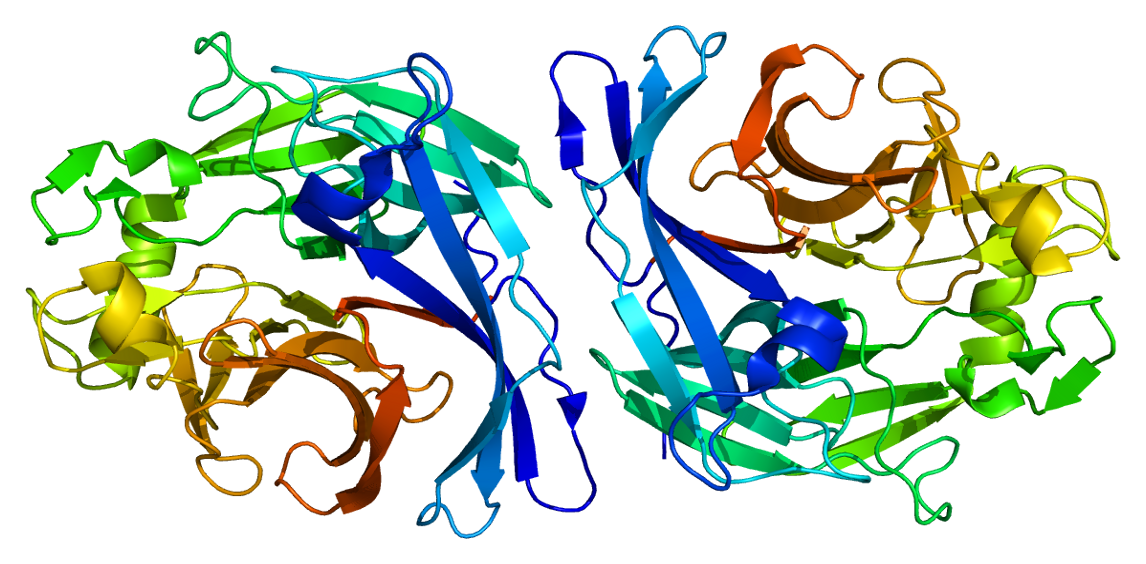
Available structures
PDB	Ortholog search: PDBe RCSB
PDB	List of PDB id codes 1S18, 1S1D, 2H2N, 2H2U

Identifiers
- Aliases: CANT1, DBQD, SCAN-1, SCAN1, SHAPY, DBQD1, calcium activated nucleotidase 1, EDM7
- External IDs: OMIM: 613165; MGI: 1923275; HomoloGene: 69460; GeneCards: CANT1; OMA:CANT1 - orthologs

Gene location (Human)
Chr.	Chromosome 17 (human)
Band	17q25.3	Start	78,991,716 bp
Band	17q25.3	End	79,009,867 bp

Gene location (Mouse)
Chr.	Chromosome 11 (mouse)
Band	11 E2|11 83.15 cM	Start	118,297,115 bp
Band	11 E2|11 83.15 cM	End	118,309,912 bp
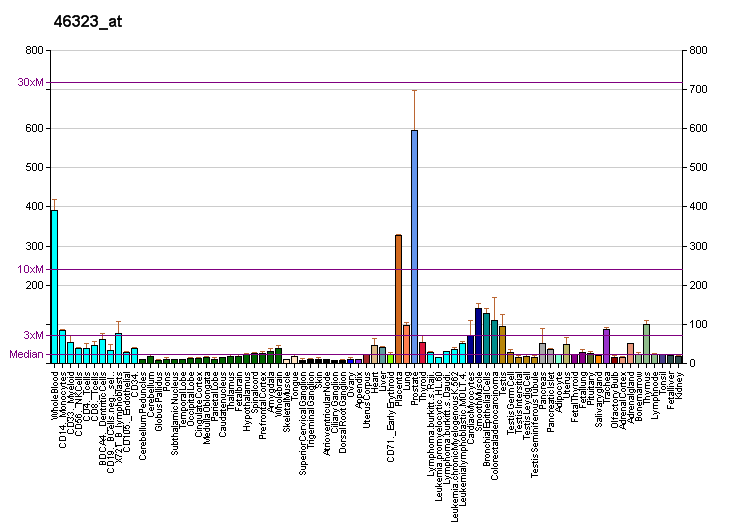

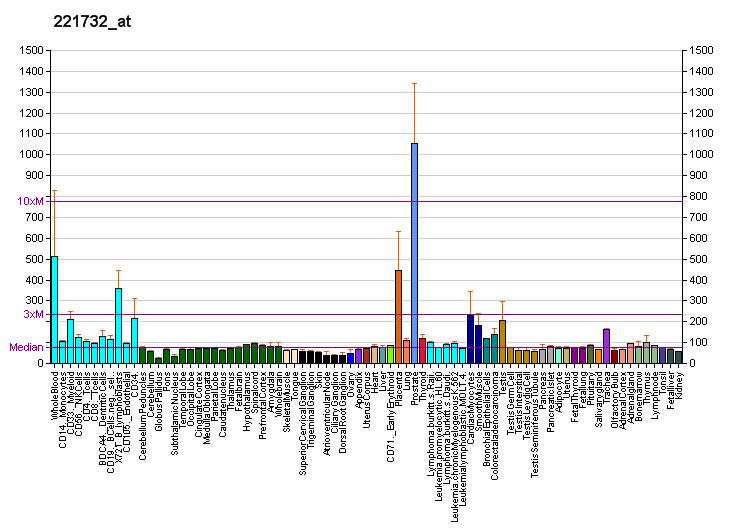
RNA expression pattern
Bgee	Human / Mouse (ortholog); Top expressed in: pancreatic ductal cell; mucosa of transverse colon; rectum; mucosa of sigmoid colon; mucosa of ileum; stromal cell of endometrium; blood; tibia; placenta; germinal epithelium / Top expressed in: pyloric antrum; gastrula; duodenum; intestinal villus; spermatocyte; large intestine; colon; epithelium of small intestine; crypt of lieberkuhn of small intestine; ileum; More reference expression data
BioGPS	More reference expression data
Gene ontology
Molecular function	uridine-diphosphatase activity; hydrolase activity; signal transducer activity; nucleoside-diphosphatase activity; metal ion binding; calcium ion binding; protein homodimerization activity; adenosine-diphosphatase activity; guanosine-diphosphatase activity; pyrophosphatase activity
Cellular component	integral component of membrane; Golgi cisterna membrane; Golgi apparatus; extracellular exosome; endoplasmic reticulum membrane; endoplasmic reticulum; extracellular region; plasma membrane; membrane; specific granule lumen; tertiary granule lumen; ficolin-1-rich granule lumen
Biological process	positive regulation of I-kappaB kinase/NF-kappaB signaling; proteoglycan biosynthetic process; signal transduction; neutrophil degranulation
Sources:Amigo / QuickGO
Orthologs
Species	Human	Mouse
Entrez	124583	76025
Ensembl	ENSG00000171302	ENSMUSG00000025575
UniProt	Q8WVQ1	Q8VCF1
RefSeq (mRNA)	NM_001159772; NM_001159773; NM_138793	NM_001025617; NM_001025618; NM_001267591; NM_001267592; NM_029502
RefSeq (protein)	NP_001153244; NP_001153245; NP_620148	NP_001020788; NP_001020789; NP_001254520; NP_001254521; NP_083778
Location (UCSC)	Chr 17: 78.99 – 79.01 Mb	Chr 11: 118.3 – 118.31 Mb
PubMed search
- Wikidata
View/Edit Human	View/Edit Mouse

CANT1 is a gene that encodes soluble calcium-activated nucleotidase 1, an enzyme, in humans.
