= ENTPD2 =

Protein-coding gene in the species Homo sapiens

Identifiers
- Aliases: ENTPD2, CD39L1, NTPDase-2, ectonucleoside triphosphate diphosphohydrolase 2
- External IDs: OMIM: 602012; MGI: 1096863; GeneCards: ENTPD2
Enzyme activity
EC #	BRENDA	ExPASy	KEGG	MetaCyc
3.6.1.5	↗	↗	↗	↗

Gene location (Human)
Chr.	Chromosome 9 (human)
Band	9q34.3	Start	137,048,107 bp
Band	9q34.3	End	137,054,061 bp

Gene location (Mouse)
Chr.	Chromosome 2 (mouse)
Band	2|2 A3	Start	25,285,886 bp
Band	2|2 A3	End	25,291,333 bp
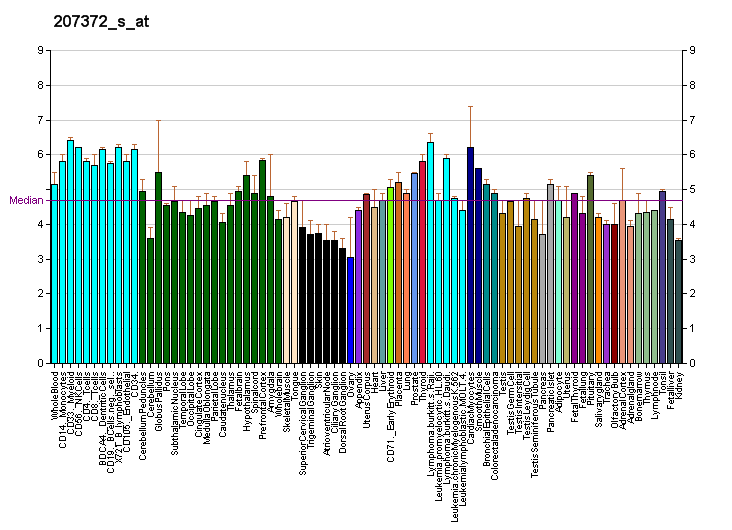
RNA expression pattern
Bgee	Human / Mouse (ortholog); Top expressed in: spinal ganglia; tibial nerve; trigeminal ganglion; mucosa of transverse colon; right uterine tube; amygdala; ventral tegmental area; skin of abdomen; hypothalamus; sural nerve / Top expressed in: seminal vesicula; sciatic nerve; ankle; tunica adventitia of aorta; lip; skin of external ear; carotid body; white adipose tissue; aortic valve; extraocular muscle; More reference expression data
BioGPS	More reference expression data
Gene ontology
Molecular function	nucleotide binding; nucleoside-diphosphatase activity; hydrolase activity; ATP binding; nucleoside-triphosphatase activity
Cellular component	integral component of membrane; endoplasmic reticulum membrane; membrane; endoplasmic reticulum; extracellular exosome; plasma membrane; basement membrane
Biological process	G protein-coupled receptor signaling pathway; purine ribonucleoside diphosphate catabolic process; platelet activation; nucleobase-containing small molecule catabolic process
Sources:Amigo / QuickGO
Orthologs
Databases	NCBI: entry; OMA: entry
Species	Human	Mouse
Entrez	954	12496
Ensembl	ENSG00000054179	ENSMUSG00000015085
UniProt	Q9Y5L3	O55026
RefSeq (mRNA)	NM_001246; NM_203468	NM_009849
RefSeq (protein)	NP_001237; NP_982293	NP_033979
Location (UCSC)	Chr 9: 137.05 – 137.05 Mb	Chr 2: 25.29 – 25.29 Mb
PubMed search
- Wikidata
View/Edit Human	View/Edit Mouse

Ectonucleoside triphosphate diphosphohydrolase 2 is an enzyme that in humans is encoded by the ENTPD2 gene.

The protein encoded by this gene is the type 2 enzyme of the ecto-nucleoside triphosphate diphosphohydrolase family (E-NTPDase). E-NTPDases are a family of ecto-nucleosidases that hydrolyze 5'-triphosphates. This ecto-ATPase is an integral membrane protein. Alternative splicing of this gene results in multiple transcript variants.

It has been shown, by scientists from the University of Warwick, that E-NTPDase2 stimulates the growth of the eye: by testing the enzyme on tadpoles, the tadpoles were found to develop extra eyes on their body.

== Embryonic yolk sac development ==
The mouse embryonic yolk sac, comprising the visceral yolk sac (VYS) and parietal yolk sac (PYS), serves as a materno-fetal exchange system, facilitating the transfer of nutrients and removal of wastes. One study aimed to analyze gene expression in VYS and PYS endodermal cells and identify novel genetic markers from microarray data, with a focus on Apoa4, Lrp2, Fxyd2, Slc34a3, and Entpd2, which showed predominant expression in VYS epithelial cells. The study extracted RNA from VYS, PYS, placenta, liver, and small intestine tissues from C3H/HeSlc strain mice. For ENTPD2 (Entpd2) mRNA analysis, digoxigenin-labeled riboprobes were prepared using a DIG RNA labeling kit. Notably, not every VYS epithelial cell showed expression of Entpd2 and Slc34a3, and Entpd2 was additionally detected in the myometrium. The findings suggest that Apoa4, Lrp2, Fxyd2, Slc34a3, and Entpd2, along with Gkn2 and Pga5, can serve as genetic markers for VYS epithelial cells and PYS cells, respectively.

== Neuroinflammation ==
This study investigated the regulation of the ENTPD2 gene and the production of the NTPDase2 protein in brain cells during neuroinflammatory and neurodegenerative conditions. The research primarily focused on rat primary cortical astrocytes and the OLN93 oligodendroglial cell line. The analysis found that NTPDase2-mRNA was the most abundant among ectonucleotidase transcripts in both cell types. In primary astrocytes, NTPDase2-mRNA significantly exceeded other transcripts. When exposed to inflammatory mediators, including IL-6, IL-1β, TNFα, and IFNγ, for 8 and 24 hours, the expression of Entpd2 (the gene encoding NTPDase2) in primary astrocytes remained unaffected at both mRNA and protein levels. However, ATP and the anti-inflammatory cytokine IL-10 increased the levels of Entpd2 mRNA and protein. These findings provide valuable insights into the regulation of NTPDase2 in neuroinflammatory conditions, specifically highlighting the lack of impact on Entpd2 expression by certain proinflammatory cytokines in primary astrocytes.

== Taste cell differentiation ==
The study focuses on the turnover of taste cells, which are constantly replaced throughout an animal's life. The discovery that the transcription factor Etv1 plays a role in regulating the differentiation of taste cells responsible for sweet, umami, and salty tastes is significant. The study examined the expression of certain genes, including Entpd2, in circumvallate papillae (structures on the tongue containing taste buds) of both wild-type (WT) mice and those with Etv1 deficiency (Etv1C/C mice). There is a potential link between Etv1, a transcription factor discussed in the study, and the regulation or expression of Entpd2 in taste cells. This finding advances our understanding of the molecular mechanisms involved in taste cell homeostasis and provides new insights into the lineage of taste cells.

The SARS-CoV-2 virus, responsible for COVID-19, may directly affect taste receptor cells (TRCs) in the oral cavity. The virus binds to angiotensin-converting enzyme 2 (ACE2) on a subset of TRCs, specifically type II cells in taste buds. Biopsies from COVID-19 patients with taste changes confirmed the presence of replicating virus in these cells. The study uses ENTPD2 (ectonucleoside triphosphate diphosphohydrolase 2) as a marker for type I taste cells. The study's findings suggest that there is no overlap of ACE2 (the receptor for the SARS-CoV-2 virus causing COVID-19) with the probe for the transcript of ENTPD2. This suggests that ACE2 is not expressed in the same cells as ENTPD2 in taste buds, providing information about the distribution of ACE2 in relation to different types of taste cells. This could be crucial in understanding how SARS-CoV-2 interacts with specific cells in the oral cavity and how it might impact taste perception. The disruption of stem cells in taste papillae during infection suggests a potential mechanism for sudden taste changes in COVID-19 patients, indicating the need for further research into the virus's impact on taste bud dynamics during and after infection.

== Taste sensitivity ==
Exploring the function of taste buds, this study examines gene-targeted Entpd2-null mice, globally lacking the NTPDase2 enzyme. The Entpd2-null mice exhibited normal numbers and sizes of taste buds. Luciferin/luciferase assays performed on the circumvallate tissue of these knockout mice revealed heightened levels of extracellular ATP. Electrophysiological recordings from both the chorda tympani and glossopharyngeal taste nerves indicated reduced responses to all taste stimuli in Entpd2-null mice. Notably, the depressions were more pronounced in the glossopharyngeal nerve compared to the chorda tympani nerve, encompassing all taste qualities. Specifically, responses to sweet and umami stimuli were more significantly affected in the chorda tympani. The study proposes that the elevated extracellular ATP levels in Entpd2-knockout mice may desensitize P2X receptors associated with nerve fibers, leading to a dampening of taste responses.

Scientist employed various techniques to investigate how the removal of the Entpd2 gene affects taste epithelia. Initially, they utilized RT-PCR to assess the presence of NTPDase2 mRNA in pooled taste buds from fungiform and circumvallate papillae. The results demonstrated that the genetic deletion of Entpd2 successfully eradicated the expression of NTPDase2 mRNA in taste buds. To confirm the presence of all three types of taste cells in the knockout (KO) mice, RT-PCR was used to examine the expression of specific markers for each cell type. Specifically, they looked for GLAST for type I cells, α-gustducin, transient receptor potential melastatin 5 (TRPM5), and phospholipase C β2 (PLCβ2) for type II cells, and synaptosomal-associated protein 25 (SNAP25) for type III cells. The PCR results indicate the presence of all three cell types in both circumvallate and fungiform taste buds of the KO mice. Furthermore, to confirm that NTPDase2 is the sole functional ectoATPase in taste buds, there was comparison of ectoATPase activity in circumvallate papillae between wild-type (WT) and Entpd2-KO animals. Using two different substances, ADP and ATP, helped distinguish specific staining for ectoATPase, representing NTPDase2 or NTPDase8 (26), from less specific nucleotidases that break down both ADP and ATP. In the case of animals with the usual genetic makeup (WT), there was an observed a concentrated reaction product in taste buds when ATP, not ADP, was the substance used. This highlights the high precision of the ectonucleotidase in taste buds, corresponding to the presence of NTPDase2. Conversely, in animals lacking the Entpd2 gene (Entpd2-KO), there was no detectable ectoATPase activity in taste buds when ATP was used, confirming NTPDase2's significant role in degrading ATP in this system. In both the usual genetic makeup and the Entpd2-KO groups, nerve bundles beneath taste buds showed nucleotidase activity when ADP was the substance used, indicating the existence of a different nucleotidase in and around these nerve bundles.

To assess the impact of removing the Entpd2 gene on taste bud synaptic function, the researchers measured responses to taste stimuli using whole-nerve recordings from the chorda tympani and glossopharyngeal nerves in both normal and Entpd2-null animals. The animals lacking Entpd2 exhibited decreased responses to all taste qualities in both nerves. Findings indicate that the failure to break down ATP and its buildup in the taste tissue of Entpd2-knockout mice leads to reduced responses to all taste qualities.

The central discovery of this study is that the genetic removal of NTPDase2, the sole ectoATPase expressed in taste buds, leads to a decline in neural responses to taste stimuli. Despite the unaffected taste bud numbers and cell types in the knockout, the reduced responsiveness is likely due to the absence of ATP degradation, resulting in elevated tissue levels of ATP. Since ATP activates P2X receptors on gustatory nerve fibers, essential for neurotransmission in the taste system, the genetic deletion of ectoATPase is proposed to disrupt purinergic transmission at this critical synapse. In parallel, the area surrounding inactive taste tissue in Entpd2-null mice exhibits heightened nanomolar ATP concentrations, indicating a connection to the desensitization of P2X3 homomers. This suggests a potential link to the observed decrease in responsiveness. Furthermore, the distinctive presence of P2X2 and P2X3 subunits in different taste nerves may elucidate the specific impact on taste perception.
