= ENTPD5 =

Protein-coding gene in the species Homo sapiens

Identifiers
- Aliases: ENTPD5, CD39L4, NTPDase-5, PCPH, ectonucleoside triphosphate diphosphohydrolase 5, ectonucleoside triphosphate diphosphohydrolase 5 (inactive)
- External IDs: OMIM: 603162; MGI: 1321385; GeneCards: ENTPD5
Enzyme activity
EC #	BRENDA	ExPASy	KEGG	MetaCyc
3.6.1.6	↗	↗	↗	↗
3.6.1.42	↗	↗	↗	↗

Gene location (Human)
Chr.	Chromosome 14 (human)
Band	14q24.3	Start	73,958,010 bp
Band	14q24.3	End	74,019,399 bp

Gene location (Mouse)
Chr.	Chromosome 12 (mouse)
Band	12 D1|12 39.18 cM	Start	84,420,631 bp
Band	12 D1|12 39.18 cM	End	84,455,803 bp
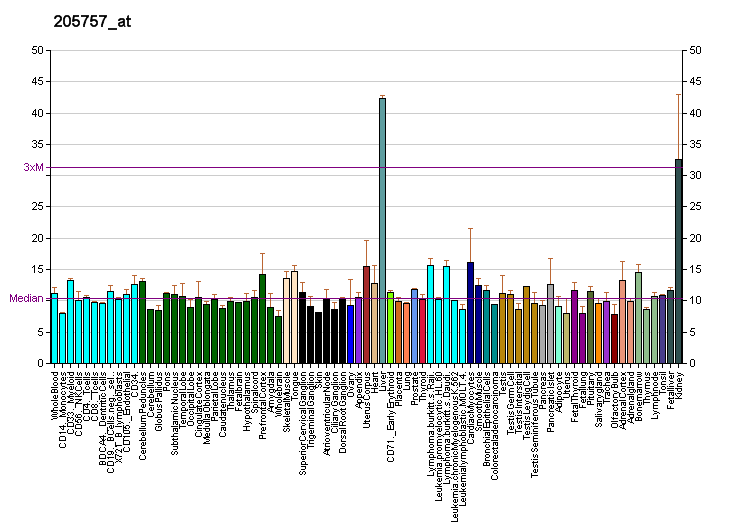
RNA expression pattern
Bgee	Human / Mouse (ortholog); Top expressed in: mucosa of sigmoid colon; rectum; jejunal mucosa; duodenum; liver; mucosa of transverse colon; right lobe of liver; human kidney; epithelium of colon; mucosa of ileum / Top expressed in: proximal tubule; right kidney; human kidney; left lobe of liver; transitional epithelium of urinary bladder; olfactory epithelium; esophagus; right ventricle; jejunum; duodenum; More reference expression data
BioGPS	More reference expression data
Gene ontology
Molecular function	guanosine-diphosphatase activity; uridine-diphosphatase activity; protein binding; hydrolase activity; nucleoside-diphosphatase activity
Cellular component	endoplasmic reticulum; extracellular region
Biological process	'de novo' posttranslational protein folding; ATP metabolic process; protein glycosylation; protein N-linked glycosylation; cell population proliferation; positive regulation of glycolytic process; regulation of phosphatidylinositol 3-kinase signaling; nucleobase-containing small molecule catabolic process
Sources:Amigo / QuickGO
Orthologs
Databases	NCBI: entry; OMA: entry
Species	Human	Mouse
Entrez	957	12499
Ensembl	ENSG00000187097	ENSMUSG00000021236
UniProt	O75356	Q9WUZ9
RefSeq (mRNA)	NM_001249; NM_001321984; NM_001321985; NM_001321986; NM_001321987 NM_001321988; NM_001330189; NM_001382256; NM_001382257; NM_001382258; NM_001382259; NM_001382260; NM_001382262; NM_001382263	NM_001026214; NM_001286049; NM_001286058; NM_007647
RefSeq (protein)	NP_001240; NP_001308913; NP_001308914; NP_001308915; NP_001308916 NP_001308917; NP_001317118; NP_001369185; NP_001369186; NP_001369187; NP_001369188; NP_001369189; NP_001369191; NP_001369192	NP_001021385; NP_001272978; NP_001272987; NP_031673
Location (UCSC)	Chr 14: 73.96 – 74.02 Mb	Chr 12: 84.42 – 84.46 Mb
PubMed search
- Wikidata
View/Edit Human	View/Edit Mouse

Ectonucleoside triphosphate diphosphohydrolase 5 is an enzyme that in humans is encoded by the ENTPD5 gene.

ENTPD5 is similar to E-type nucleotidases (NTPases)/ecto-ATPase/apyrases. NTPases, such as CD39, mediate catabolism of extracellular nucleotides. ENTPD5 contains 4 apyrase-conserved regions which is characteristic of NTPases.
