= Self-assembling peptide =

Organic molecules

Self-assembling peptides are a category of peptides which undergo spontaneous assembly into ordered nanostructures. Originally described in 1993, these designer peptides have attracted interest in the field of nanotechnology for their potential for application in areas such as biomedical nanotechnology, tissue cell culturing, molecular electronics, and more.

Effectively self-assembling peptides act as building blocks for various material and device applications. The essence of this technology is to replicate what nature does: to use molecular recognition processes to form ordered assemblies of building blocks capable of conducting biochemical activities.

== Background ==
Peptides can serve as sturdy building blocks for a wide range of materials as they can be designed to combine with a range of other building blocks such as lipids, sugars, nucleic acids, metallic nanocrystals, and so on; this gives the peptides an edge over carbon nanotubes, which are another popular nanomaterial, as the carbon structure is unreactive. They also exhibit biocompatibility and molecular recognition; the latter is particularly useful as it enables specific selectivity for building ordered nanostructures. Additionally, peptides have superb resistance to extreme temperature, detergents, and denaturants.

The ability of peptides to perform self-assembly allows them to be used as fabrication tools, which will continue to grow as a fundamental part of nanomaterials production. The self-assembling of peptides is facilitated through the molecules' structural and chemical compatibility with each other. The structures formed demonstrate physical and chemical stability.

An advantage to using self-assembling peptides to build nanostructures in a bottom-up approach is that specific features can be incorporated; the peptides can be modified to serve specific functions. This approach means the final structures are made from the self-integration of small, simple building blocks. This approach is needed for nanoscale structure, as the top-down method of miniaturizing devices using sophisticated lithography and etching techniques has reached a physical limit. Moreover, the top-down approach applies mainly to silicon-based technology and cannot be used for biological developments.

The peptide structure is organized hierarchically into four levels. The primary structure of a peptide is the sequence of the amino acids of the peptide chain. Amino acids are monomer molecules that carry a carboxyl and an amine functional group; a spectrum of other chemical groups are attached to different amino acids, such as thiols and alcohols. This facilitates the wide range of chemical interactions and, therefore, molecular recognitions that peptides are capable of; for designer self-assembling peptides, both natural and non-natural amino acids are used. They link together in a controlled manner to form short peptides, which link to form long polypeptide chains.

Along these chains, the alternating amine (NH) and carbonyl (CO) groups are highly polar, and they readily form hydrogen bonds with each other. These hydrogen bonds bind peptide chains together to give rise to secondary structures. Stable secondary structures include the alpha-helices and beta-sheets. Unstable secondary structures are random loops, turns, and coils that are formed. The secondary structure that is formed depends on the primary structure; different sequences of the amino acids exhibit different preferences.

Secondary structures usually fold, with a variety of loops and turns, into a tertiary structure. What differentiates the secondary structure from the tertiary structure is that the latter includes non-covalent interactions. The quaternary structure combines two or more different chains of polypeptide to form what is known as a protein sub-unit.

The self-assembly process of the peptide chains includes dynamic—reassembly, which occurs repeatedly in a self-healing manner. The types of interactions that facilitate the reassembly of peptide structures include van der Waals forces, ionic bonds, hydrogen bonds, and hydrophobic forces. These forces also facilitate the molecular recognition function that the peptides encompass. These interactions work on the basis of preference dependent on energy properties and specificity.

A range of different nanostructures can be formed. Nanotubes are defined as elongated nano-objects with definite inner holes. Nanofibrils are solid on the inside, as opposed to the hollow nanotubes.

== Processing/Synthesis ==
Peptide synthesis can be easily conducted by the established method of solid-phase chemistry in gram or kilogram quantities. The d-isomer conformation can be used for peptide synthesis.

Nanostructures can be made by dissolving dipeptides in 1,1,1,3,3,3-hexafluoro-2-propanol at 100 mg/ml and then diluting it with water for a concentration of less than 2 mg/ml. Multiwall nanotubes with diameters of 80–300 nm, made of dipeptides from the diphenylalanine motif of Alzheimer's β-amyloid peptide are made by this method. If a thiol is introduced into the diphenylalanine then nano-spheres can be formed instead; nanospheres with diameters of 10–100 nm can also be made this way, from a diphenylglycine peptide.

== Characterization ==
Atomic force microscopy can measure the mechanical properties of nanotubes. Scanning-electron and atomic-forces microscopy are used to examine Lego peptide nanofiber structures.

Dynamic light scattering studies show structures of surfactant peptides. Surfactant peptides have been studied using a quick-freeze/deep–etch sample preparation method which minimizes effects on the structure. The sample nanostructures are flash frozen at −196 °C and can be studied three-dimensionally, using Transmission electron microscopy.

Using computer technology, a molecular model of peptides and their interactions can be built and studied.

Specific tests can be performed on certain peptides: for example, a fluorescent emission test could be applied to amyloid fibrils by using the dye Thioflavin T, which binds specifically to the peptide and emits blue fluorescence when excited.

== Structure ==
=== Dipeptides ===
The simplest peptide building blocks are dipeptides. Nanotubes formed from dipeptides are the widest among peptide nanotubes. An example of a dipeptide that has been studied is a peptide from the diphenylalanine motif of the Alzheimer's β-amyloid peptide.

Dipeptides have also been shown to self-assemble into hydrogels, another form of nanostructures, when connected to the protecting group Fluorenylmethyloxycarbonyl chloride. Experiments focusing on the dipeptide Fmoc-Diphenylalanine have been conducted that have explored the mechanism in which Fmoc-diphenylalanine self-assembles into hydrogels via π-π interlocked β-sheets. Phenylalanine has an aromatic ring, a crucial part of the molecule due to its high electron-density, which favors self-assembly where the rings stack and enable the assembly to occur.

=== Lego peptides / Ionic self-complementary peptides ===
These peptides are approximately 5 nm in size and have 16 amino acids. The class of Lego peptides has the unique characteristics of having two distinct surfaces being either hydrophobic or hydrophilic, similar to the pegs and holes of Lego blocks. The hydrophobic side promotes self-assembly in water and the hydrophilic side has a regular arrangement of charged amino-acid residues, which in turn brings about a defined pattern of ionic bonds. The arrangement of the residues can be classified according to the order of the charges; Modulus I has a charge pattern of + − + − + −, modulus II + + − − + + − −, and modulus III + + + − − − + + +, and so on. The peptides self-assemble into nanofibers approximately 10 nm long in the presence of alkaline cations or an addition of peptide solution. The fibers form ionic interactions with each other to form checkerboard-like matrices, which develop into a scaffold hydrogel with a high water content of larger than 99.5–99.9% and pores of 10–200 nm in diameter. These hydrogels allow neurite outgrowth and therefore can be used as scaffolds for tissue engineering.

=== Surfactant peptides ===
Surfactant–like peptides that undergo self-assembly in water to form nanotubes and nanovesicles have been designed using natural lipids as guides. This class of peptides has a hydrophilic head (with one or two charged amino acids such as aspartic or glutamic acids, or lysine or histidine acids) with a hydrophobic tail (with 4 or more hydrophobic amino acids such as alanine, valine, or leucine). The peptide monomers are about 2-3 nm long and consist of seven or eight amino acids; the peptide length can be adjusted by adding or removing acids.

In water, surfactant peptides undergo self-assembling to form well-ordered nanotubes and nanovesicles of 30–50 nm through intermolecular hydrogen bonds and the packing of the hydrophobic tails in between the residues, like micelle formation. Transmission electron microscopy examination on quick-frozen samples of surfactant-peptide structures showed helical open-ended nanotubes. The samples also showed dynamic behaviours and some vesicle "buds" sprouting out of the peptide nanotubes.

=== Molecular paint or carpet peptides ===
This class of peptides undergoes self-assembling on a surface and form monolayers just few nanometers thick. These types of molecular "paint" or "carpet" peptides are able to form cell patterns, interacting with or trapping other molecules onto the surface. This class of peptides consists of three segments: the head is a ligand part, which has functional groups attached for recognition by other molecules or cell surface receptors; the middle segment is a "linker", allows the head to interact at a distance away from the surface and which also controls the flexibility and the rigidity of the peptide structure; and, at the other end of the linker, a surface anchor where a chemical group on the peptide forms a covalent bond with a particular surface. This class of peptides has the unique property of being able to change molecular structure dramatically. This property is best illustrated using an example. The DAR16-IV peptide, has 16 amino acids and forms a 5 nm β-sheet structure at ambient temperatures; a swift change in structure occurs at high temperature or a change in pH when a 2.5 nm α-helix forms.

=== Cyclic peptides ===
Extensive research has been performed on nanotubes formed by stacking cyclic peptides with an even number of alternating D and L amino acids. These nanotubes are the narrowest formed by peptides. The stacking occurs through intermolecular hydrogen bonding, and the end product is a cylindrical structure with the amino acid side chains of the peptide defining the properties of the outer surface of the tube and the peptide backbone determining the properties of the inner surface of the tube. Polymers can also be covalently attached to the peptides, in which case a polymer shell around the nanotube can be formed. By applying peptide design, the inner diameter, which is completely uniform, can be specified; the outer surface properties can also be affected by peptide design. Therefore, these cyclic nanotubes can form in a range of different environments.

== Property evaluation ==
One should evaluate the properties (mechanical, electronic, optical, magnetic, etc.) of the material that has been chosen and indicate what the major differences would be if the same material were not at nanoscale. Nanotubes formed from dipeptides are stable under extreme conditions. Dry nanotubes do not degrade until 200 °C; nanotubes display exceptional chemical stability at a range of pH and in the presence of organic solvents. This is a marked difference from natural biological systems, which are often unstable and sensitive to temperature and chemical conditions.

Indentation-atomic-force-microscopy experiments showed that dry nanotubes on mica have an average stiffness of 160 N/m and a high Young's modulus of 19–27 GPa. Although they are less stiff than carbon and non-carbon nanotubes, with these values these nanotubes are amongst some of the stiffest known biological materials. The mechanisms which facilitates the mechanical stiffness has been suggested to be the intermolecular hydrogen bonds and rigid aromatic side chains on the peptides. Apart from those made by cyclic peptides, the nanotubes' inner and outer surface properties have not yet been successfully independently modified. Hence, it presents a limitation that the inner and outer tube surfaces are identical.

Molecular assembly mostly occurs through weak non-covalent bonds, which include: hydrogen bonds, ionic bonds, van der Waals interactions, and hydrophobic interactions.

== Self-assembling peptides versus carbon nanotubes ==
Carbon nanotubes (CNTs) are another type of nanomaterial that have attracted much interest for their potential to serve as building blocks for bottom-up applications. They have excellent mechanical, electrical, and thermal properties and can be fabricated to a wide range of nanoscale diameters, making them attractive and appropriate for the development of electronic and mechanical devices. They demonstrate metal-like properties and can act as remarkable conductors.

However, there are several areas where peptides have advantages over CNTs. One advantage is that peptides have almost limitless chemical functionality compared with the very limited chemical interactions that CNTs can perform due to their non-reactiveness. Furthermore, CNTs exhibits strong hydrophobicity which results in a tendency to clump in aqueous solutions and therefore have limited solubility; their electrical properties are also affected by humidity, and the presence of oxygen, N_{2}O, and NH_{3}.

It is also difficult to produce CNTs with uniform properties and this poses serious drawbacks as the reproducibility of precise structural properties is a key concern for commercial purposes. Lastly, CNTs are expensive, with prices in the range of hundreds of dollars per gram, rendering most applications commercially unviable.

== Present and future applications ==
The appeal of designer peptides is that they are structurally simple and are simple and affordable to produce a large scale.

=== Cell culturing ===
Peptide scaffolds formed from LEGO peptides have been used extensively for 3D cell culturing as they closely resemble the porosity and the structure of extra-cellular matrices. These scaffolds have also been used in cell proliferation and differentiation into desired cell types. Experimentations with rat neurons demonstrated the usefulness of LEGO peptides in cell culturing. Rat neurons that were attached to the peptides projected functional axons that followed the contours of the peptide scaffolds.

=== Biomedical applications ===
By examining the behaviours of the molecular 'switch' peptides, more information about interactions between proteins and, more significantly, the pathogenesis of some protein conformational diseases can be obtained. These diseases include scrapie, kuru, Huntington's, Parkinson's and Alzheimer's.

Self-assembling and surfactant peptides can be used as targeting delivery systems for genes, drugs and RNAi. Research has already shown that cationic dipeptides NH_{2}-Phe-Phe-NH_{2} nanovesicles, which are about 100 nm in diameter, can be absorbed into cells through endocytosis and deliver oligonucleotides into the cell; this is one example of how peptide nanostructure can in used in gene and drug delivery. It is also envisaged that water-soluble molecules and biological molecules would be able to be delivered to cells in this way. Self-assembling LEGO peptides can form biologically compatible scaffolds for tissue repair and engineering, which should be of great potential, as a large number of diseases cannot be cured by small molecule drugs; a cell-based therapy approach is needed and peptides could potentially play a huge role in this. Cyclic peptide nanotubes formed from self-assembly can act as ion channels, which form pores through the cell membrane and cause cellular osmotic collapse. Peptide can be designed to preferentially form on bacterial cell membranes and thus these tubes can perform as antibacterial and cytotoxin agents.

=== Molecular electronics applications ===
Molecular 'switch' peptides can be made into nanoswitches when an electronic component is incorporated. Metal nanocrystals can be covalently linked to the peptides to make them electronically responsive; research is currently being conducted on how to develop electronically controlled molecules and molecular 'machines' using such molecular 'switches'. Peptide nanofibers can also be used as growth templates for a range of inorganic materials, such as silver, gold, platinum, cobalt, nickel, and various semiconducting materials. Electrons transferring aromatic moieties can also be attached to the side chains of peptides to form conducting nanostructures that can transfer electrons in a certain direction. Metal and semiconductor binding peptides have been used for the fabrication of nanowires. Peptides self-assemble into hollow nanotubes to act as casting molds; metal ions that migrate inside the tube undergo reduction to metallic form. The peptide 'mold' can then be enzymatically destroyed to produce a metal nanowire of about 20 nm diameter. This has been done making gold nanowires and this application is especially significant because nanowires at this scale cannot be made by lithography. Researchers have also successfully developed multi-layer nanocables with a silver core nanowire, a peptide insulation layer, and a gold outer coat. This is done by reducing AgNO_{3} inside nanotubes, and then bounding a layer of thiol-containing peptides with gold particles attached. This layer acts as a nucleation site during the next step, where a process of electroless deposition layers a coating of gold on the nanotubes to form metal-insulator-metal trilayer coaxial nanocables. Peptide nanotubes are able to produce nanowires of uniform size, and this is particularly useful in the nano-electric applications as electrical and magnetic properties are sensitive to size.

Nanotubes' exceptional mechanical strength and stability makes them excellent materials for application in this area. Nanotubes have also been used in developing electrochemical biosensing platforms and have proved to have great potential. Dipeptide nanotubes deposited on graphite electrodes improved electrode sensitivity; thiol-modified nanotubes deposited on gold with a coating of enzymes improved sensitivity and reproducibility for the detection of glucose and ethanol, as well as a shortened detection time, large current density, and improved stability. Nanotubes have also been successfully coated with proteins, nanocrystals, and metalloporphyrin through hydrogen bonding, and these coated tubes have great potential as chemical sensors.

Designed peptides with a known structure that would self-assemble into a regular growth template would enable the self-assembly of nanoscale electronic circuits and devices. However, one issue that has yet to be resolved is the ability to control the positioning of the nanostructures. This positioning relative to substrates, to each other, and to other functional components is crucial. Although progress has been made in this domain, more work has to be completed before this control can be established.

=== Miscellaneous applications ===
Molecular carpet/paint peptides can be used in diverse industries. They can be used as 'nano-organizers' for non-biological materials, or could be used to study cell-cell communications and behavior. It has also been found that the catalytic abilities of the lipase enzyme is greatly improved when encapsulated in a peptide nanotube. After incubation in a nanotube for a week, the catalytic activities of the enzyme is improved by 33%, compared with free-standing lipases at room temperature; at 65 °C the improvement rises to 70%. It is suggested that the enhanced ability is due to a conformational change to an enzymatically active structure.

== Limitations ==
Although well ordered nanostructures have already been successfully formed from self-assembling peptides, their potential will not be fully fulfilled until useful functionality is incorporated into the structures.

Moreover, so far most of the peptide structures formed are in one or two dimensions. In contrast, in nature, most biological structures are in three dimensions. Criticism has come because there is a lack of theoretical knowledge about the self-assembling behaviours of peptides. Further knowledge could prove to be very useful in facilitating rational designs and precise control of the peptide assemblies. Lastly, although an extensive amount of work is being conducted on developing self-assembling peptide-related applications, issues such as commercial viability and processability have not been paid the same amount of attention. Yet these issues must be assessed if further useful applications are to be realized.
