= Dicalcium phosphate =

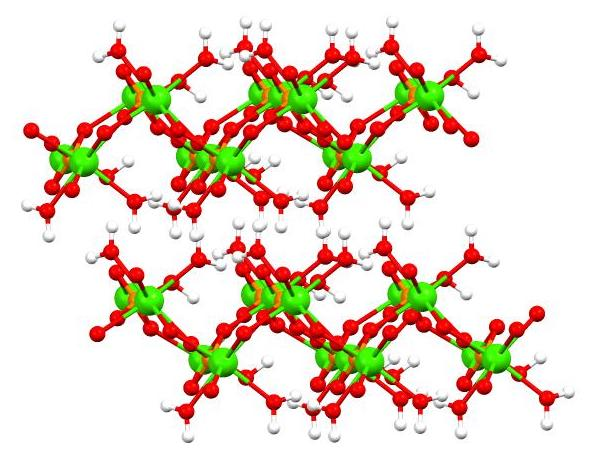

Names
- IUPAC name calcium hydrogen phosphate
- Other names calcium hydrogen phosphate, phosphoric acid calcium salt (1:1)

Identifiers
CAS Number	7757-93-9; 7789-77-7 (dihydrate)
3D model (JSmol)	Interactive image
ChemSpider	94606
ECHA InfoCard	100.028.933
E number	E341(ii) (antioxidants, ...)
PubChem CID	104805
UNII	L11K75P92J; O7TSZ97GEP (dihydrate)
CompTox Dashboard (EPA)	DTXSID20872529 DTXSID90872536, DTXSID20872529
- InChI: InChI=1S/Ca.H3O4P.2H2O/c;1-5(2,3)4;;/h;(H3,1,2,3,4);2*1H2/q+2;;;/p-2 Key: XAAHAAMILDNBPS-UHFFFAOYSA-L; InChI=1/Ca.H3O4P.2H2O/c;1-5(2,3)4;;/h;(H3,1,2,3,4);2*1H2/q+2;;;/p-2 Key: XAAHAAMILDNBPS-NUQVWONBAM
- SMILES: O.O.OP(=O)([O-])[O-].[Ca+2]

Properties
Chemical formula	CaHPO_{4}
Molar mass	136.06 g/mol (anhydrous); 172.09 (dihydrate)
Appearance	white powder
Odor	odorless
Density	2.929 g/cm^{3} (anhydrous); 2.31 g/cm^{3} (dihydrate)
Melting point	decomposes
Solubility in water	0.02 g/100 mL (anhydrous); 0.02 g/100 mL (dihydrate)

Structure
Crystal structure	triclinic

Hazards
NFPA 704 (fire diamond)	1 0 0
Flash point	Non-flammable

Related compounds
Other anions	Calcium pyrophosphate
Other cations	Magnesium phosphate Monocalcium phosphate Tricalcium phosphate Strontium phosphate
- Except where otherwise noted, data are given for materials in their standard state (at 25 °C [77 °F], 100 kPa). verify (what is ?) Infobox references

Dicalcium phosphate is the calcium phosphate with the formula CaHPO_{4} and its dihydrate. The "di" prefix in the common name arises because the formation of the HPO_{4}^{2–} anion involves the removal of two protons from phosphoric acid, H_{3}PO_{4}. It is also known as dibasic calcium phosphate or calcium monohydrogen phosphate. Dicalcium phosphate is used as a food additive, and it is found in some toothpastes as a polishing agent and biomaterial.

== Preparation ==
Dibasic calcium phosphate is produced by neutralizing calcium hydroxide with phosphoric acid, precipitating the dihydrate as a solid. At 60 °C the anhydrous form is precipitated:

H_{3}PO_{4} + Ca(OH)_{2} → CaHPO_{4} +2H_{2}O

To prevent degradation that would form hydroxyapatite, sodium pyrophosphate or trimagnesium phosphate octahydrate are added when, for example, dibasic calcium phosphate dihydrate is to be used as a polishing agent in toothpaste.

In a continuous process CaCl_{2} can be treated with (NH_{4})_{2}HPO_{4} to form the dihydrate:

CaCl_{2} + (NH_{4})_{2}HPO_{4} → CaHPO_{4}·2H_{2}O + 2NH_{4}Cl

A slurry of the dihydrate is then heated to around 65–70 °C to form anhydrous CaHPO_{4} as a crystalline precipitate, typically as flat diamondoid crystals, which are suitable for further processing.

Dibasic calcium phosphate dihydrate is formed in "brushite" calcium phosphate cements (CPC's), which have medical applications. An example of the overall setting reaction in the formation of "β-TCP/MCPM" (β-tricalcium phosphate/monocalcium phosphate) calcium phosphate cements is:

Ca_{3}(PO_{4})_{2} + Ca(H_{2}PO_{4})_{2}·H_{2}O + 7 H_{2}O → 4 CaHPO_{4}·2H_{2}O

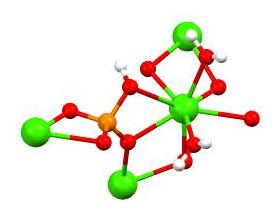
A portion of the lattice of dicalcium phosphate dihydrate, highlighting the 8-coordinated Ca^{2+} center and the location of the protons on three ligands (green = calcium, red = oxygen, orange = phosphorus, white = hydrogen)

== Structure ==
Three forms of dicalcium phosphate are known:

- dihydrate, CaHPO_{4}·2H_{2}O (DCPD), the mineral brushite
- monohydrate, CaHPO_{4}·H_{2}O (DCPM)
- anhydrous CaHPO_{4} (DCPA), the mineral monetite. Below pH 4.8, the dihydrate and anhydrous forms of dicalcium phosphate are the most stable (insoluble) calcium phosphates.

The structure of the anhydrous and dihydrated forms has been determined by X-ray crystallography, and the structure of the monohydrate was determined by electron crystallography. The dihydrate (shown in table above) as well as the monohydrate, adopt layered structures.

== Uses and occurrence ==
Dibasic calcium phosphate is mainly used as a dietary supplement in prepared breakfast cereals, dog treats, enriched flour, and noodle products. It is also used as a tableting agent in some pharmaceutical preparations, including some products meant to eliminate body odor. Dibasic calcium phosphate is also found in some dietary calcium supplements (e.g., Bonexcin). It is used in poultry feed. It is also used in some toothpastes as a tartar control agent.

Heating dicalcium phosphate gives dicalcium diphosphate, a useful polishing agent:

2 CaHPO_{4} → Ca_{2}P_{2}O_{7} + H_{2}O

In the dihydrate (brushite) form, it is found in some kidney stones and dental calculi.

== See also ==
- Brushite
- Monocalcium phosphate
- Tricalcium phosphate
