= Cattiite =

Phosphate mineral

General
- Category: Phosphate Mineral
- Formula: Mg_{3}(PO_{4})_{2}·22H_{2}O
- IMA symbol: Ctt
- Strunz classification: 8.CE.50
- Crystal system: Triclinic
- Crystal class: Pinacoidal – (1̅)
- Space group: P1̅
- Unit cell: a = 6.932(2) Å, b = 6.925(3) Å, c = 16.154(5) Å, α = 82.21(4)°, β = 89.70(4)°, γ = 119.51(3)°, Z = 1

Identification
- Formula mass: 659.66 gm
- Color: Colorless
- Crystal habit: Massive, granular
- Cleavage: Perfect on (001)
- Fracture: Irregular/Uneven
- Tenacity: Brittle
- Mohs scale hardness: 2
- Luster: Vitreous, with gypsum-like pearly sheen on cleavage planes.
- Streak: White
- Diaphaneity: Transparent
- Specific gravity: 1.65
- Density: 1.65 g/cm^{3} (Measured); 1.64 g/cm^{3} (Calculated)
- Optical properties: Biaxial (−)
- Refractive index: n_{α} =1.459 n_{β} = 1.470 n_{γ} = 1.470
- Birefringence: δ = 0.011
- Pleochroism: Non-pleochroic

Cattiite is a phosphate mineral. The mineral was first found in a veins of dolomite carbonatites veins at the bottom of the Zhelezny (Iron) Mine in the Kovdor massif, Kola Peninsula, Russia. Cattiite was tentatively identified as Mg_{3}(PO_{4})_{2}·22H_{2}O, which as a high hydrate magnesium orthophosphate. Later structural studies, revealed the existence of two polytypes named Mg_{3}(PO_{4})_{2}·22H_{2}O-1A1 and Mg_{3}(PO_{4})_{2}·22H_{2}O-1A2.

The polytype, Mg_{3}(PO_{4})_{2}·22H_{2}O-1A2, had both the mineral and the name of the mineral approved (2000-032) by the Commission on New Minerals and Mineral Names or the (CNMMN) of the International Mineralogical Association or the (IMA). The name was approved by the CNMMN and the IMA was cattiite. The mineral cattiite was named that in the honor of the Michele Catti, Professor of Physical Chemistry at the University of Milano Bicocca in Italy, because of his work on the crystal chemistry of hydrated oxy-salts.

== Natural occurrence and localities ==
Cattiite bas been found in centimeter sized cavities that are within a 20–40 cm thick of the dolomite carbonatites that were enriched in late hydrothermal Mg-rich phosphates that was located at the Zhelezny Mine quarry. The vein of dolomite carbonatites that the cattiite is found cross-cuts forsterite and magnetite ore that are located at the bottom of the mine's quarry. The mineral occurs as a mass that is up to 1.5 cm in size and usually contains a single crystal that fills the free space in the cavities and interstices of associated minerals. These associated minerals are dolomite, nastrophite, bakhchisaraitsevite, sjogrenite, magnetite, and carbonate-fluorapatite.

Cattiite is also mined in Western Australia, Chile, France, Namibia, and United Kingdom.

== Properties ==
=== Crystallography ===
Cattiite is triclinic and has both very close cell parameters and crystal structures. The mineral has a space group of P1̅. The structures of the mineral are based on an isolated PO_{4} tetrahedra and Mg(H_{2}O)_{6} octahedra that are joined by hydrogen bonds. The structures of the (001) sheets of the octahedra plus a sheet made of octahedra and tetrahedra form a polar (001) layer that is copied by a center of symmetry to form a layer with thickness that correlates with the c parameter. The X-ray single-crystal diffractometry of the mineral cattiite has a cell that is a = 6.932(2) Å, b = 6.925(3) Å, c = 16.154(5) Å, α = 82.21(4)°, β = 89.70(4)°, γ = 119.51(3)°, V = 666.3(3) Å^{3}, and Z = 1.

=== Physical properties ===
Cattiite usually occurs as a mass of single crystals that are sometimes shown to be the dominant form on the {001} axis. Along the {001} axis is where the percent cleavage located at, while the uneven fractures are in other directions. Luster of cattiite is vitreous, with a gypsum-like pearly sheen that is on the perfect cleavage planes {001}. The mineral is colorless and transparent. Cattiite has a Mohs hardness of 2 and also a tenacity of being brittle. The specific gravity of cattiite is 1.65. The density of the mineral is 1.65 g/cm^{3} (measured) and 1.64 g/cm^{3} (calculated).

It is non-pleochroic and bi-axial (−). The refractive index of the mineral is α = 1.459 (1), β = 1.470(1), and γ = 1.470(1). The optical orientation of cattiite is X ^ [001] = 80°, Y ^ [100] = 10°, and Z is perpendicular to [001]. The minerals also has a weak dispersion, r < v.

=== Chemical properties ===
The high hydration that cattiite has makes it unstable under heating. There were thermal studies done that showed that Mg_{3}(PO_{4})_{2}·22H_{2}O as a synthetic at 70 °C, was partially dehydrated. This dehydration of the mineral began occurring ar 40–60 °C depending on the relative humidity in the air. It is easily soluble in diluted cold 10% hydrochloric acid (HCl). Cattiite also loses water under a vacuum when it was studied under an electron microprobe.

== See also ==
- List of Minerals
- Phosphate, PO_{4}^{3−}
- Magnesium Orthophosphate, Mg_{3}(PO_{4})_{2}·22H_{2}O
- Dolomite, CaMg(CO_{3})_{2}
- Bakhchisaraitsevite, Na_{2}Mg_{5}(PO_{4})_{4}·7H_{2}O
- Nastrophite, Na(Sr,Ba)(PO_{4})·9H_{2}O
- Magnetite, Fe_{3}O_{4}
- Sjogrenite, Mg_{6}Fe_{2}(OH)_{16}(CO_{3})·4H_{2}O
- Carbonate-fluorapatite, Ca_{5}(PO_{4},CO_{3})_{3}(F,O)
- Forsterite, Mg_{2}SiO_{4}
