= Dental calculus =

Form of hardened dental plaque

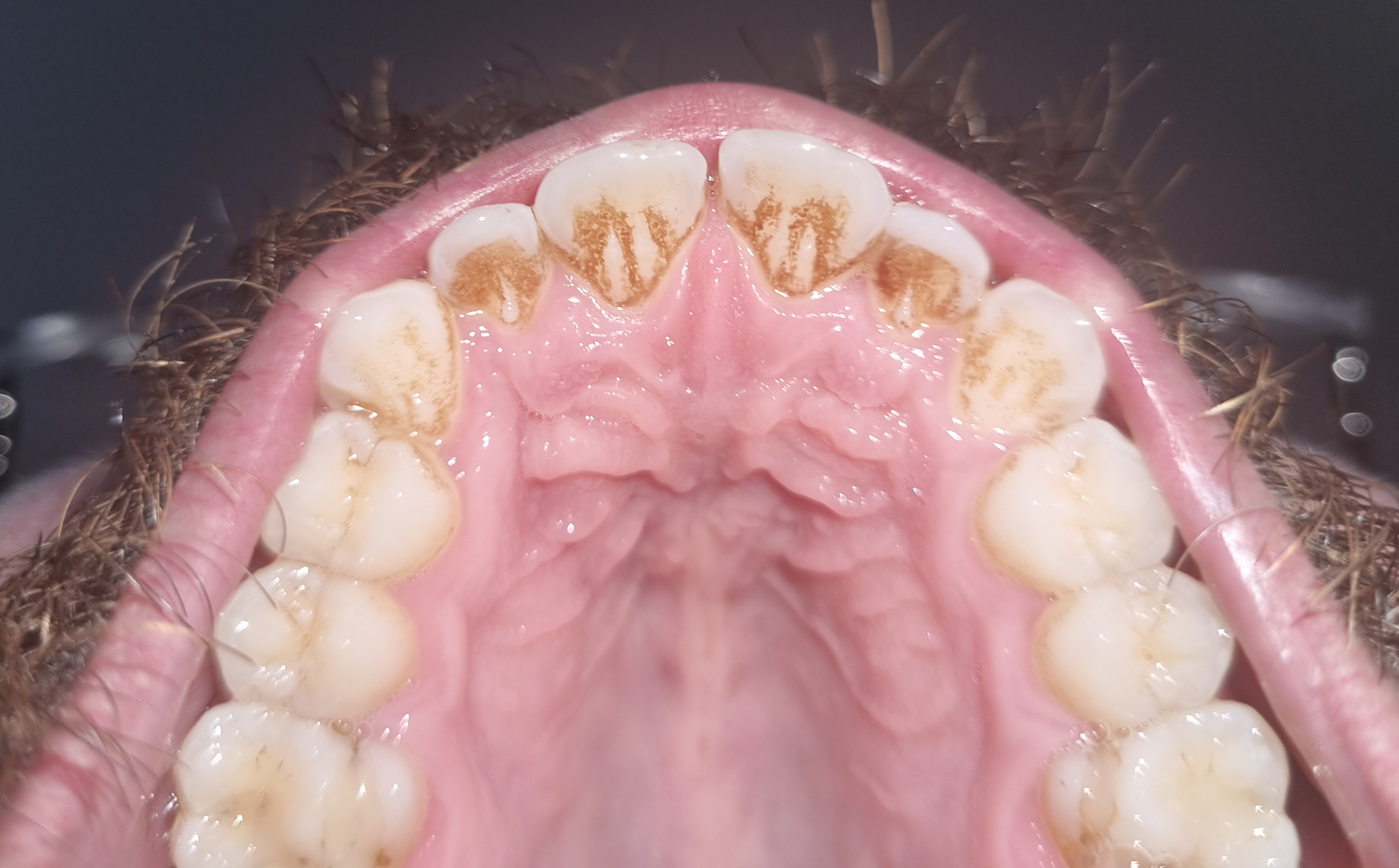
Dental tartar in an adult male

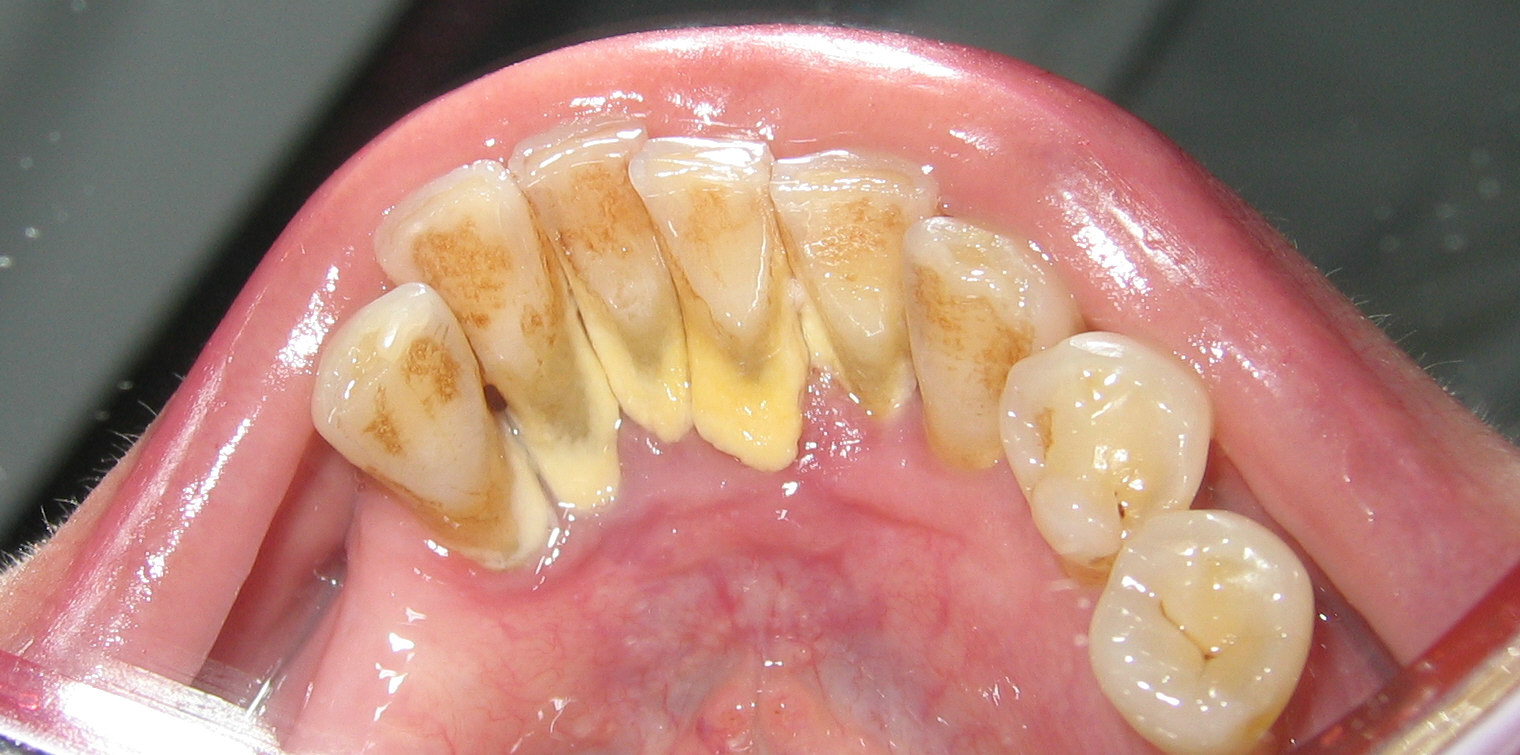
Heavy staining and calculus deposits exhibited on the lingual surface of the mandibular anterior teeth, along the gumline

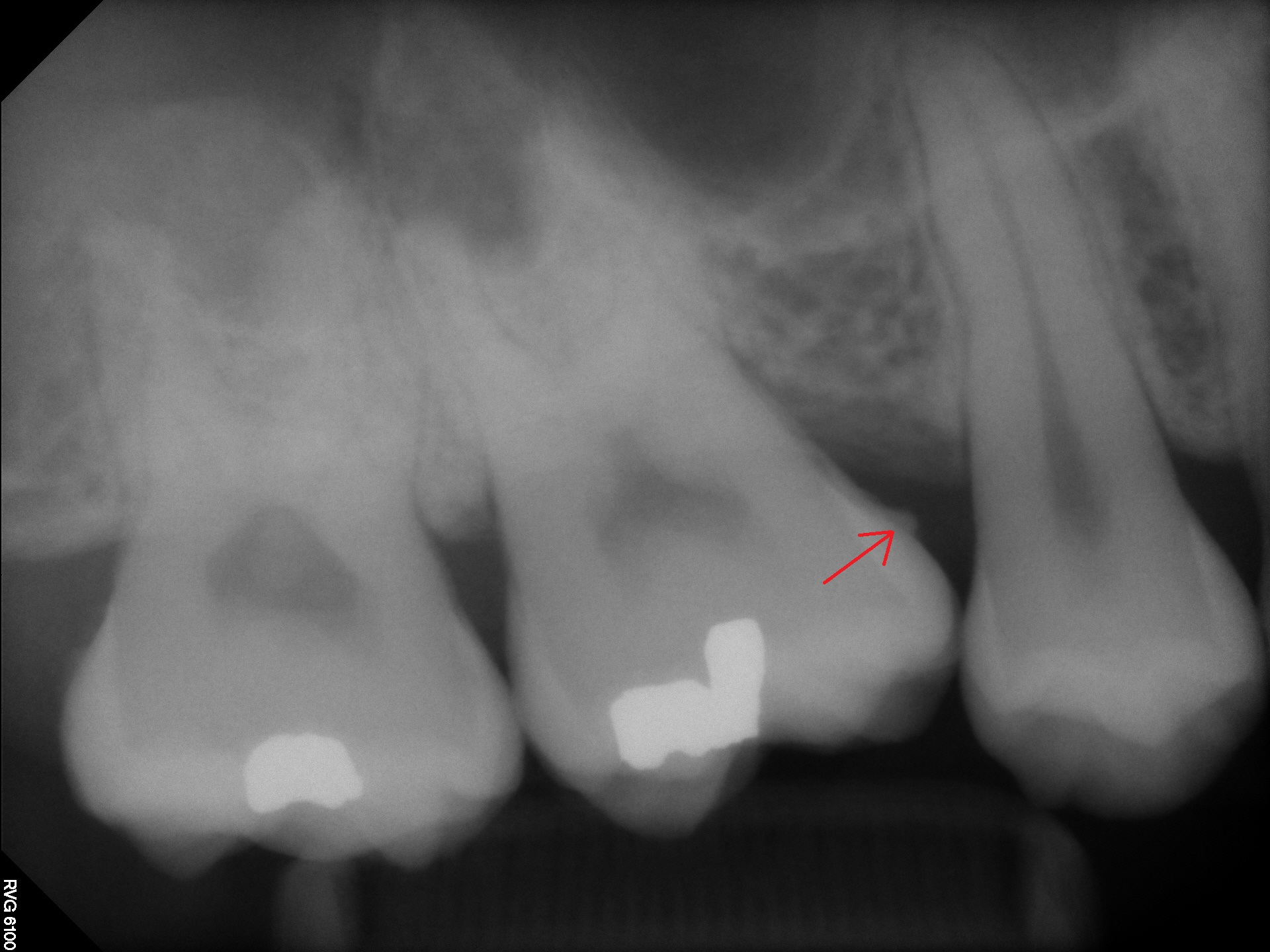
Calculus deposit (indicated with a red arrow) on x-ray image

In dentistry, dental calculus or tartar is a form of hardened dental plaque. It is caused by precipitation of minerals from saliva and gingival crevicular fluid (GCF) in plaque on the teeth. This process of precipitation kills the bacterial cells within dental plaque, but the rough and hardened surface that is formed provides an ideal surface for further plaque formation. This leads to calculus buildup, which compromises the health of the gingiva (gums). Calculus can form both along the gumline, where it is referred to as supragingival ('above the gum'), and within the narrow sulcus that exists between the teeth and the gingiva, where it is referred to as subgingival ('below the gum').

Calculus formation is associated with a number of clinical manifestations, including bad breath, receding gums and chronically inflamed gingiva. Brushing and flossing can remove plaque from which calculus forms; however, once formed, calculus is too hard (firmly attached) to be removed with a toothbrush. Calculus buildup can be removed with ultrasonic tools or dental hand instruments (such as a periodontal scaler).

== Etymology ==
The word comes from Latin calculus 'small stone', from calx 'limestone, lime', probably related to Greek χάλιξ chalix 'small stone, pebble, rubble', which many trace to a Proto-Indo-European root for 'split, break up'. Calculus was a term used for various kinds of stones. This spun off many modern words, including calculate ('use stones for mathematical purposes'), and calculus, which came to be used, in the 18th century, for accidental or incidental mineral buildups in human and animal bodies, like kidney stones and minerals on teeth.

Tartar, on the other hand, originates in Greek as well (tartaron), but as the term for the white encrustation inside casks (a.k.a. potassium bitartrate, commonly known as cream of tartar). This came to be a term used for calcium phosphate on teeth in the early 19th century.

== Chemical composition ==
Calculus is composed of both inorganic (mineral) and organic (cellular and extracellular matrix) components.

=== In supra-gingival calculus ===
The mineral proportion of supragingival calculus ranges from approximately 40–60%, depending on its location in the dentition, and consists primarily of calcium phosphate crystals organized into four principal mineral phases, listed here in order of increasing ratio of phosphate to calcium:

- hydroxyapatite, Ca_{5}(PO_{4})_{3}OH
- whitlockite, Ca_{9}(Mg,Fe)(PO_{4})_{6}(PO_{3}OH)
- octacalcium phosphate, Ca_{8}H_{2}(PO_{4})_{6} · 5 H_{2}O
- and brushite, CaHPO_{4} · 2 H_{2}O

The organic component is approximately 85% cellular and 15% extracellular matrix. Cell density within dental plaque and calculus is very high, consisting of an estimated 200,000,000 cells per milligram. The cells within calculus are primarily bacterial, but also include at least one species of archaea (Methanobrevibacter oralis) and several species of yeast (e.g., Candida albicans). The organic extracellular matrix in calculus consists primarily of proteins and lipids (fatty acids, triglycerides, glycolipids, and phospholipids), as well as extracellular DNA. Trace amounts of host, dietary, and environmental microdebris are also found within calculus, including salivary proteins, plant DNA, milk proteins, starch granules, textile fibers, and smoke particles.

=== In sub-gingival calculus ===
Sub-gingival calculus is composed almost entirely of two components: fossilized anaerobic bacteria whose biological composition has been replaced by calcium phosphate salts, and calcium phosphate salts that have joined the fossilized bacteria in calculus formations.

The following minerals are detectable in calculus by X-ray diffraction:

- brushite (CaHPO_{4} · 2 H_{2}O)
- octacalcium phosphate (Ca_{8}H_{2}(PO_{4})_{6} · 5 H_{2}O)
- magnesium-containing whitlockite (Ca_{9}(Mg,Fe)(PO_{4})_{6}(PO_{3}OH))
- carbonate-containing hydroxyapatite (approximately Ca_{5}(PO_{4})_{3}OH but containing some carbonate).

== Calculus formation ==
Dental calculus typically forms in incremental layers that are easily visible using both electron microscopy and light microscopy. These layers form during periodic calcification events of the dental plaque, but the timing and triggers of these events are not well understood. The formation of calculus varies widely among individuals and at different locations within the mouth. Many variables have been identified that influence the formation of dental calculus, including age, sex, ethnic background, diet, location in the oral cavity, oral hygiene, bacterial plaque composition, host genetics, access to professional dental care, physical disabilities, systemic diseases, tobacco use, and drugs and medications.

Supragingival calculus formation is most abundant on the buccal (cheek) surfaces of the maxillary (upper jaw) molars and on the lingual (tongue) surfaces of the mandibular (lower jaw) incisors. These areas experience high salivary flow because of their proximity to the parotid and sublingual salivary glands.

Subgingival calculus forms below the gumline and is typically darkened in color by the presence of black-pigmented bacteria, whose cells are coated in a layer of iron obtained from heme during gingival bleeding. The reason fossilized bacteria are initially attracted to one part of the subgingival tooth surface over another is not fully understood. However, once the first layer is attached, more calculus components are naturally attracted to the same places due to electrical charge. This is because the calcium phosphate salts contained in them exist as electrically unstable ions (unlike calcium phosphate, the primary component of teeth). The fossilized bacteria pile up rather haphazardly, while free-floating ionic components (calcium phosphate salts) fill in the gaps.

The resultant hardened structure can be compared to concrete, with the fossilized bacteria playing the role of aggregate, and the smaller calcium phosphate salts being the cement. The "hardened" calculus formations are at the heart of periodontal disease and treatment.

== Clinical significance ==
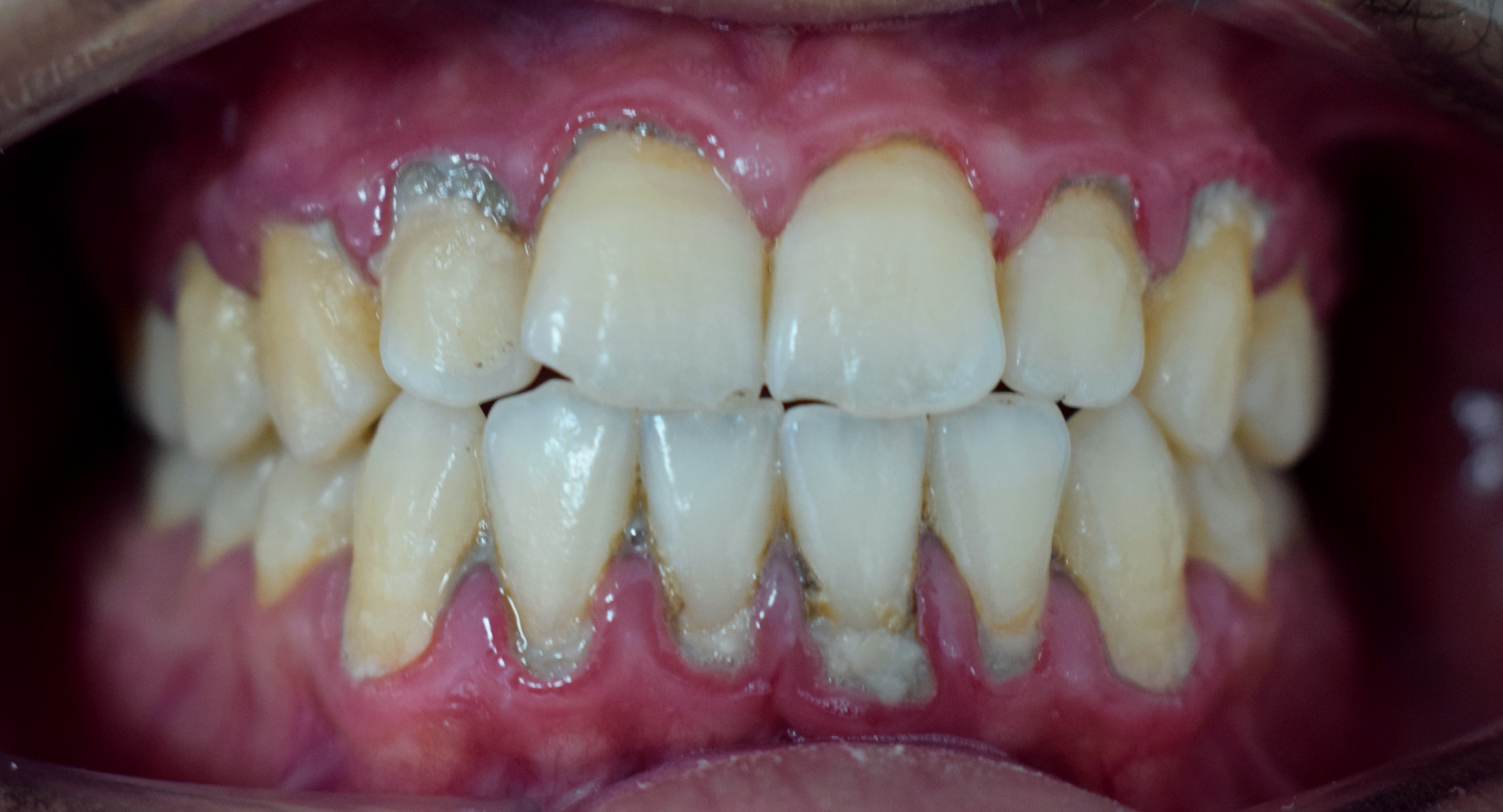
Retentive surface of calculus allows for further plaque accumulation.

Plaque accumulation causes the gingiva to become irritated and inflamed, and this is referred to as gingivitis. Gingival irritation that leads to loss of the connective tissue fibers attaching the gums to the teeth and bone surrounding the tooth is known as periodontitis. Dental plaque is not the sole cause of periodontitis, but is often referred to as a primary aetiology. Plaque that remains in the oral cavity long enough will eventually calcify and become calculus. Calculus is detrimental to gingival health because it serves as a trap for increased plaque formation and retention; thus, calculus, along with other factors that cause a localized build-up of plaque, is referred to as a secondary aetiology of periodontitis.

When plaque is supragingival, the bacterial content contains a great proportion of aerobic bacteria and yeast, or those bacteria which utilize and can survive in an environment containing oxygen. Subgingival plaque contains a higher proportion of anaerobic bacteria, or those bacteria which cannot exist in an environment containing oxygen. Several anaerobic plaque bacteria, such as Porphyromonas gingivalis, secrete antigenic proteins that trigger a strong inflammatory response in the periodontium, the specialized tissues that surround and support the teeth. Prolonged inflammation of the periodontium leads to bone loss and weakening of the gingival fibers that attach the teeth to the gums, two major hallmarks of periodontitis. Supragingival calculus formation is nearly ubiquitous in humans, but to differing degrees. Almost all individuals with periodontitis exhibit considerable subgingival calculus deposits. Dental plaque bacteria have been linked to cardiovascular disease and mothers giving birth to pre-term low weight infants, but there is no conclusive evidence yet that periodontitis is a significant risk factor for either of these two conditions.

== Prevention ==
Toothpaste with pyrophosphates or zinc citrate has been shown to produce a statistically significant reduction in plaque accumulation, but the effect of zinc citrate is so modest that its clinical importance is questionable. Some calculus may form even without plaque deposits, by direct mineralisation of the pellicle.

== Calculus in other animals ==
Calculus formation in other animals is less well studied than in humans, but it is known to form in a wide range of species. Domestic pets, such as dogs and cats, frequently accumulate large calculus deposits. Animals with highly abrasive diets, such as ruminants and equids, rarely form thick deposits and instead tend to form thin calculus deposits that often have a metallic or opalescent sheen. In animals, calculus should not be confused with crown cementum, a layer of calcified dental tissue that encases the tooth root underneath the gingival margin and is gradually lost through periodontal disease.

== Archaeological significance ==
Dental calculus has been shown to contain well preserved microparticles, DNA and protein in archaeological samples. The information these molecules contain can reveal information about the oral microbiome of the host and the presence of pathogens. It is also possible to identify dietary sources as well as study dietary shifts and occasionally evidence of craft activities.

== Removal of calculus after formation ==
Plaque and calculus deposits are a major etiological factor in the development and progression of oral disease. An important part of the scope of practice of a dental hygienist is the removal of plaque and calculus deposits. This is achieved through the use of specifically designed instruments for debridement of tooth surfaces. Treatment with these types of instruments is necessary as calculus deposits cannot be removed by brushing or flossing alone. To effectively manage disease or maintain oral health, thorough removal of calculus deposits should be completed at frequent intervals. The recommended frequency of dental hygiene treatment can be made by a registered professional, and is dependent on individual patient needs. Factors that are taken into consideration include an individual's overall health status, tobacco use, amount of calculus present, and adherence to a professionally recommended home care routine.

Hand instruments are specially designed tools used by dental professionals to remove plaque and calculus deposits that have formed on the teeth. These tools include scalers, curettes, jaquettes, hoes, files and chisels. Each type of tool is designed to be used in specific areas of the mouth. Some commonly used instruments include sickle scalers which are designed with a pointed tip and are mainly used supragingivally. Curettes are mainly used to remove subgingival calculus, smooth root surfaces and to clean out periodontal pockets. Curettes can be divided into two subgroups: universals and area specific instruments. Universal curettes can be used in multiple areas, while area specific instruments are designed for select tooth surfaces. Gracey curettes are a popular type of area specific curettes. Due to their design, area specific curettes allow for better adaptation to the root surface and can be slightly more effective than universals. Hoes, chisels, and files are less widely used than scalers and curettes. These are beneficial when removing large amounts of calculus or tenacious calculus that cannot be removed with a curette or scaler alone. Chisels and hoes are used to remove bands of calculus, whereas files are used to crush burnished or tenacious calculus.

Ultrasonic scalers, also known as power scalers, are effective in removing calculus, stain, and plaque. These scalers are also useful for root planing, curettage, and surgical debridement. Not only is tenacious calculus and stain removed more effectively with ultrasonic scalers than with hand instrumentation alone, it is evident that the most satisfactory clinical results are when ultrasonics are used in adjunct to hand instrumentation. There are two types of ultrasonic scalers; piezoelectric and magnetostrictive. Oscillating material in both of these handpieces cause the tip of the scaler to vibrate at high speeds, between 18,000 and 50,000 Hz. The tip of each scaler uses a different vibration pattern for removal of calculus. The magnetostrictive power scaler vibration is elliptical, activating all sides of the tip, whereas the piezoelectric vibration is linear and is more active on the two sides of the tip.

Special tips for ultrasonic scalers are designed to address different areas of the mouth and varying amounts of calculus buildup. Larger tips are used for heavy subgingival or supragingival calculus deposits, whereas thinner tips are designed more for definitive subgingival debridement. As the high frequency vibrations loosen calculus and plaque, heat is generated at the tip. A water spray is directed towards the end of the tip to cool it as well as irrigate the gingiva during debridement. Only the first 1–2 mm of the tip on the ultrasonic scaler is most effective for removal, and therefore needs to come into direct contact with the calculus to fracture the deposits. Small adaptations are needed in order to keep the tip of the scaler touching the surface of the tooth, while overlapping oblique, horizontal, or vertical strokes are used for adequate calculus removal.

Current research on potentially more effective methods of subgingival calculus removal focuses on the use of near-ultraviolet and near-infrared lasers, such as Er,Cr:YSGG lasers. The use of lasers in periodontal therapy offers a unique clinical advantage over conventional hand instrumentation, as the thin and flexible fibers can deliver laser energy into periodontal pockets that are otherwise difficult to access. Near-infrared lasers, such as the Er,CR:YSGG laser, have been proposed as an effective adjunct for calculus removal as the emission wavelength is highly absorbed by water, a large component of calculus deposits. An optimal output power setting of 1.0-W with the near-infrared Er,Cr:YSGG laser has been shown to be effective for root scaling. Near-ultraviolet lasers have also shown promise as they allow the dental professional to remove calculus deposits quickly, without removing underlying healthy tooth structure, which often occurs during hand instrumentation. Additionally, near-ultraviolet lasers are effective at various irradiation angles for calculus removal. Discrepancies in the efficiency of removal are due to the physical and optical properties of the calculus deposits, not to the angle of laser use. Dental hygienists must receive additional theoretical and clinical training on the use of lasers, where legislation permits.

== See also ==
- Calculus (medicine)
- Toothbrush
- Tooth decay
- Teeth cleaning
