= Octacalcium phosphate =

Names
- IUPAC name octacalcium dihydrogen hexakis(phosphate) pentahydrate
- Other names Octacalcium Phosphate

Identifiers
CAS Number	pentahydrate: 14096-86-7; anhydrous: 13767-12-9
3D model (JSmol)	pentahydrate: Interactive image
ChemSpider	anhydrous: 110428
PubChem CID	pentahydrate: 158549866; anhydrous: 123896
CompTox Dashboard (EPA)	pentahydrate: DTXSID50160264
- InChI: InChI=1S/8Ca.6H3O4P.5H2O/c;;;;;;;;6*1-5(2,3)4;;;;;/h;;;;;;;;6*(H3,1,2,3,4);5*1H2/q8*+2;;;;;;;;;;;/p-16 Key: HPOUENNZJZYZEI-UHFFFAOYSA-A
- SMILES: pentahydrate: O.O.O.O.O.OP(=O)([O-])[O-].OP(=O)([O-])[O-].[O-]P(=O)([O-])[O-].[O-]P(=O)([O-])[O-].[O-]P(=O)([O-])[O-].[O-]P(=O)([O-])[O-].[Ca+2].[Ca+2].[Ca+2].[Ca+2].[Ca+2].[Ca+2].[Ca+2].[Ca+2]

Properties
Chemical formula	Ca_{8}H_{2}(PO_{4})_{6}·5H_{2}O
Molar mass	446.234023 g/mol
Appearance	white powder
- Except where otherwise noted, data are given for materials in their standard state (at 25 °C [77 °F], 100 kPa). verify (what is ?) Infobox references

Octacalcium phosphate (OCP) is a form of calcium phosphate with formula Ca_{8}H_{2}(PO_{4})_{6}·5H_{2}O. OCP may be a precursor to tooth enamel, dentine, and bones. OCP is a precursor of hydroxyapatite (HA), an inorganic biomineral that is important in bone growth. OCP has garnered lots of attention due to its inherent biocompatibility. While OCP exhibits good properties in terms of bone growth, very stringent synthesis requirements make it difficult for mass productions, but nevertheless has shown promise not only in-vitro, but also in in-vivo clinical case studies.

== Background ==
Johan Gottlieb discovered calcium phosphate in 1769, and since its discovery calcium phosphate has been widely researched and been found to be one of the most important inorganic structures in hard tissue of vertebrates. Calcium phosphate has been used to treat various illnesses such as rickets, scrofula, diarrhea, ulcer, and inflammation, but its uses in orthopedics and dentistry have been the main area of focus for many years. Before the use of calcium phosphates in orthopedics, bioceramics were widely utilized due to their bio inertness and advantageous mechanical properties, but despite the success of bioceramics, this material simply substituted broken bones, and did not provide a means of bone regrowth within the damaged tissue.

By the 1900s scientists had started using calcium phosphate during surgeries as a means of applying simple bone grafts, and by 1950 the genesis of self-setting calcium phosphate in combination with bioceramics had been discovered. Between 1976 and 1981 calcium phosphates started to be used more prominently as coatings for orthopedic and dental implants in order to stimulate stronger osseointegration, and by the 1990s calcium phosphate had started to become utilized as an effective mode for drug transportation and had started to branch into other fields such as tissue engineering.

Octacalcium phosphate (OCP) was discovered in the 1950s, when scientists discovered that by varying the calcium phosphate ratio, various forms of calcium phosphates could be created. OCP has widely been seen as an inorganic precursor for hydroxyapatite which is similar to calcium phosphate in that it is an inorganic mineral found in bones and teeth that plays a major role in the overall structure, strength, and regeneration capabilities of bone. Along with this, compared to other forms of calcium phosphate OCP has been found to have greater levels of biocompatibility and increased rates of osteointegration. The advantageous properties of OCP have made it a primary candidate for many orthopedic uses, and although mass production has been utilized, extremely strict chemical constraints make it difficult to mass-produce and fast paces.

== Type of ceramic–tissue interaction ==
Ceramics can be categorized into four categories based on their interaction with tissues. Type #1 (dense, nonporous, and inert) ceramics are strong, stiff, and attach to bone/tissue resulting in a cementing of the device into the tissue. Type #2 (porous and inert) ceramics exhibit a lower overall strength but are useful as coatings and result in biological fixation. Type #3 (dense and nonporous) ceramics exhibit biological fixation by chemically attaching directly to bone. Finally, type #4 (dense, nonporous, and resorbable) ceramics are slowly replaced with bone. The nature of octacalcium phosphate resembles that of type #4 ceramics.

Type #4 ceramics differ based on the ratio of calcium to phosphate (Ca:P); the most stable/ideal ratio (Ca:P=10:6=1.67) results in hydroxyapatite (HA) which is often used in orthopedic settings due to the inherent biocompatibility and similarity to natural bone tissue. While HA has been widely used and established as an excellent candidate for orthopedic usage, OCP (Ca:P=1.33), while harder to synthesize and more difficult to sinter and mold, has been proven to not only be more resorbable than HA, but also proven to result in greater overall bone formation than HA.

== Material properties ==
The table below displays various octacalcium phosphate material properties and descriptions of said properties.

Octacalcium Phosphate Properties
Crystal structure (bulk property)	The structure of octacalcium phosphate has been determined to be triclinic with a space group P1.; The lattice properties of the OCP unit cell: a = 19.692 Å, b = 9.523 Å, c = 6.835 Å, ɑ= 90.15°, β = 92.54°, and ɣ = 108.65°; When collapsed at high enough temperatures: a = 18.86 Å, and ɣ = 114.65°; The crystal structure itself consists of layers of calcium deficient apatite and a hydrated layer making the overall structure of OCP similar to that of brushite.
Stoichiometric composition (bulk property)	33.3 mol% acidic phosphate to total phosphate found in either the hydrated or calcium deficient layer of the crystal structure
Chemical composition (bulk property)	Ca/P ratio for OCP is 1.33; Non stoichiometric ratios obtained via wet chemical synthesis result in a Ca/P value of 1.27.
Thermal stability (bulk property)	Due to the large amount of water within OCP (caused by the hydrated layer) the thermal stability is relatively low, displaying complete decomposition at temperatures above 300 °C; Dehydration of the hydrated layer occurs at 170 °C and resulting in contraction causing the OCP crystal structure to collapse
Solubility (bulk property)	Soluble at pH values of 7.4; Solubility at 25 °C = 0.0081 g/L
Bending strength (bulk property)	Spherule crystals display bending strengths of 7.633 ± 0.833 MPa; Plate crystals display bending strengths of 7.07 ± 2.6 MPa; Ribbon-Like display bending strengths of 16.2 ± 0.7 MPa
Young's modulus (bulk property)	Spherule crystals display Young's Modulus values of 4.8 ± 0.633 GPa; Plate crystals display Young's Modulus values of 4.15 ± 0.62 GPa; Ribbon-Like crystals display Young's Modulus values of 6.4 ± 0.7 GPa
=== Toughness === (bulk property)	Spherule crystals display Toughness values of 0.157 ± 0.02 mm GPa; Plate crystals display Toughness values of 0.133 ± 0.03 mm MPa; Ribbon-Like crystals display Toughness values of 0.28 ± 0.03 mm MPa
Surface energy (surface property)	For (100) OCP crystal planes (apathetic layers) the surface energy is 1311 mJ/m^{2} in a vacuum and 462 mJ/m^{2} in water; For (200) OCP crystal planes (hydrated Layers) the surface energy is 858 mJ/m^{2} in a vacuum and 189 mJ/m^{2} in water

The three crystal types (spherule, ribbon like, and plate) all exhibit flexural behavior; some have brittle characteristics, others have ductile characteristics. Spherule- and ribbon-like crystals are brittle, similar to ceramics; deforming elastically up to a maximum stress, then immediately fracturing (irreversible deformation). Plate crystals, however, displayed more ductile characteristics. Unlike spherule and ribbon like crystals, plate crystals deformed elastically up to the maximum stress, but did not fracture, instead transitioning into plastic deformation similar to metals and some polymers.

== Synthesis ==
Due to the multitude of implications of octacalcium phosphate (OCP), many synthesis methods have been developed as well as strides to upscale the overall production rate of octacalcium phosphate. Methods include precipitation reactions, hydrolysis reactions, aging, and ion substitution. Previously stated methods have all been able to produce high-purity OCP; but, to upscale the production of OCP, it is imperative to control the reaction conditions as slight deviations in molarity, pH, or temperature can easily lead to different calcium phosphate variations such as dicalcium phosphate or hydroxyapatite.

=== Precipitation ===
Precipitation involves mixing Ca(CH_{3}COO)_{2} (calcium acetate) with a sodium phosphate solution usually consisting of a mixture of Na_{2}HPO_{4} (disodium phosphate) and NaH_{2}PO_{4} (sodium hydrogen phosphate). The reaction constraints for precipitation reactions consisted of a calcium acetate molarity of 0.04 M, and sodium phosphate solution molarity of 0.04 M. pH ranged from 5.0 to 6.5; temperatures ranged from 37 – 90 °C.

=== Hydrolysis ===
OCP is typically synthesized via hydrolysis of α-tricalcium phosphate (ɑ-TCP). To create OCP, ɑ-TCP along with calcium carbonate and brushite (CaHPO_{4}·2H_{2}O) are formed into a solid state in preparation for the hydrolysis. The hydrolysis reaction can then be performed by combining the previously prepared ɑ-TCP and 0.0016 M phosphoric acid at 25°C and a pH of 6. During hydrolysis, in order to prevent deviation from octacalcium phosphate, it is imperative to maintain a calcium phosphate (Ca/P) ratio of 1.33.

=== Aging ===
Aging reactions are conducted similar to the precipitation reactions, but precipitation can occasionally produce poorly defined particles due to the fast precipitation process. So, upon finishing the precipitation reaction, the solution is mixed gently for times varying from 3 to 12 hours which results in well-defined OCP crystals which can then be extracted via filtration using membrane fillers.

=== Ion substitution ===
Ion substitution reactions are conducted similar to precipitation reactions; but instead of calcium acetate, other variations are used, to result in more crystallized precipitates. Ions can include magnesium Mg^{2+}, strontium Sr^{2+}, or manganese Mn^{2+}. Varying the form of acetate used during the precipitate reactions, can have varying effects depending on the element used and the concentration of element. Strontium has been found to improve the bioactive properties of OCP. In terms of thermal stability the addition of strontium or magnesium into the structure can result in reduced thermal stability and increases in the extent of collapsed OCP.

== Octacalcium phosphate composites ==
=== Gelatin-OCP composites ===
Gel sponges are typically used as bone integration scaffolds mainly due to their inherent porosity. The porous structure of the gel itself can aid in osteointegration when combined with CaP ceramic composites. Gel-OCP composites can be formed using various methods, but a common method is via coprecipitation and has been known to produce optimal Gel-OCP composites while still maintaining the inherent porosity that is useful for osteointegration. In-vivo pre-clinical studies comparing gel-OCP composites to pure gel control groups have found that the gel scaffold can regenerate substantial amounts of bone within months (~4 months) of implantation, indicating that the gel-OCP composites exhibit high osteoconductivity allowing for enhanced bone regeneration.

=== Collagen-OCP composites ===
Collagen-OCP composites use collagen which is a matrix protein that accounts for 30% of total protein within most organisms. Collagen is unique in that it can be used in many applications, such as sponges or hydrogels, or even combined with other forms of calcium phosphate such as hydroxyapatite. Along with this, collagen-based composites exhibit similar properties and structure to natural bone tissue such as high osteoconductivity, and enhanced biointegration. Collagen-OCP composites, similar to gel-OCP composites, can be synthesized using many methods, but one common method is via molding mixtures of OCP and collagen solutions that have been extracted from animal skins. In-vivo preclinical studies evaluating the effects of collagen-OCP composites have shown that the composite by itself displays enhanced bone regeneration, osteoconductivity, and biodegradability compared to pure OCP or collagen control group as well as stimulated osteoblast and osteoclast activity during bone regrowth and remodeling indicating potential to be used for bone regrowth in clinical applications.

=== Alginate-OCP composites ===
Alginate is a polysaccharide derived from a form of brown seaweed that has spiked interest due to its favorable biocompatibility and its ease of gelation. Similar to the collagen and gel based OCP composites, both coprecipitation and mixing methods have been utilized to create alginate-OCP composites, both methods produce viable composites with favorable porosity which can be further controlled by altering the alginate concentration or centrifugal speed during synthesis reactions, Alginate-OCP composites, similar to previously stated scaffolds, have also shown increased levels of osteointegreation and osteogenic interactions as well as the ability to stimulate osteoblasts in vitro, and the ability to aid in the conversion of OCP → HA in vivo.

=== Hyaluronic Acid-OCP composites ===
Hyaluronic acid is a naturally occurring polymer; present in skin, tendons, and synovial fluid as part of the connective tissue's extracellular matrix. As a component of composites, hyaluronic acid is a delivery medium for OCP. Hyaluronic-OCP scaffolds are synthesized by simply mixing OCP granules with hyaluronic acid at a controlled pH; the result is an injectable paste. In terms of bone regeneration, hyaluronic acid-OCP composite pastes have shown enhanced osteoconductivity soon after injection, and shown biodegradation by osteoclasts.

== Applications ==
=== Orthopedics ===
The structure of OCP is closely associated with HA structure, and has thus made it an attractive bone substitute for biomaterial scientists and orthopedic surgeons. A higher osteoconductivity was first observed in the bone tissue response in mouse where OCP was placed onto the calvaria in its granule form, showing it to have higher osteoconductivity than other Ca-P materials like anhydrous dicalcium phosphate (DCP), amorphous calcium phosphate (ACP), calcium-deficient HA (CDHA), and stoichiometric HA. OCP also tends to biodegrade in the bone. OCP is osteoconductive and biodegradable, and can stimulate bone formation through osteoblast differentiation and osteoclast formation. During thermodynamic conversion of OCP to HA it was found to strongly stimulate cell capacity via hydrolysis in in-vivo environments.

Biodegradable calcium phosphates (Ca-P) like OCP can promote bone regeneration via bone remodeling, which involves both bone resorption by osteoclasts and bone formation by osteoblasts. One study showed that osteoclast formation of OCP was almost the same as that of 𝛽-tricalcium phosphate (𝛽-TCP) and that OCP and OCP/HA mixtures had higher expression of calcium coupling factor compared to 𝛽-TCP when cultured with mouse marrow macrophages.

Activation of the bone cellular responses and stimulation of bone remodeling processes, has been shown in studies where OCP granules were implanted in mouse calvarial defects. Composite scaffolds with OCP and gelatin have also been shown to induce bone regeneration in line bones in rabbits and at faster rates than 𝛽-TCP alternatives.

=== Dentistry ===
Though OCP has not been established in the dental field, bioactive properties of OCP have attracted the attention of oral surgeons and researchers. For example, OCP coatings on zirconia oral implants, could improve osseointegration of already existing ceramic implants, due to high osteoconductivity and drug delivery ability. This coating allowed for reproductibility, quick synthesis, simplicity, and good tensile adhesion strength. In certain conditions, synthesis of OCP coatings may allow for incorporation of biologically active molecules in the coating, providing potential for drug delivery applications. Studies also indicate potential for OCP-based cement as a pulp-capping agent, demonstrated in rats, concluding that OCP-based cement allowed for favorable healing processes in dental pulp.

=== Drug delivery ===
Functionalization of therapeutic agents for drug-delivery systems for the treatment of bone pathologies, has focused mainly on Ca-P nanoparticles, HA nanocrystals, and apathetic cements, coatings and porous scaffolds; but literature on the use of OCP in these applications is limited. Most of this research includes functionalization of OCP with bisphosphonates (BPs), which are commonly used as antiresorptive agents. Alendronate, a commonly used BP, has been combined with OCP in some studies, showing inhibited osteoclastogenesis and osteoclast differentiations but enhanced osteoblast proliferation and activity. Alendronate-loaded OCP also showed enhancement of osteoblast differentiation markers compared to HA-loaded alendronate. In-vitro tests carried out on osteoblast, osteoclast, and endothelial cell biomimetic environments showed that BPs imbue functionalized OCP with antiresorptive and antitumor properties.

== Safety ==
OCP has been shown to be safe in various preclinical studies. One study conducted a safety assessment after OCP collagen composites were implanted in cases of alveolar bone defects, indicating that all participants completed the trial without major problems in condition. No serious liver, renal dysfunction, electrolyte imbalance, or abnormal urinalysis results were shown, and a healthy immune response was noted. The border between the original bone and OCP composite implant became indistinguishable, indicating a safe and effective integration.

== Case studies ==
=== Case #1 ===
Case study #1 involved 60 male and female patients, 20 to 70 years old, from nine hospitals. All participants were undergoing sinus floor elevation, socket preservation, cystectomy of the jaw, or bone grafting at the alveolar cleft in preparation for a dental implant. The study itself focused on testing the efficacy of bone regrowth for OCP/Col composites.

For sinus floor elevation cases, the procedures were separated into one- and two-stage cases depending on the length between the alveolar crest and sinus floor (2 stage=< 5 mm and 1 stage=≥ 5 mm). For the one stage treatment the OCP/col composite was implanted into the alveolar space via sinus membrane elevation and the dental implants were then placed at the missing tooth region. Six months later the prosthetics were implanted into the one-stage patients. For the two-stage treatment the OCP/col composite implantation and the dental implantation were spaced apart by six months. Then six months after the dental implant procedure the prosthetics were loaded into the previously placed implants. Implants for sinus floor elevation patients were made of titanium and were not coated in any bioactive materials.

For socket preservation cases, OCP/col composites were placed into the tooth removal site and then sutured closed. Six months post OCP/col implantation the dental implants were placed at the missing tooth site and six months later the prosthetics were loaded into the implants.

For cystectomy cases, after the gums and periosteum were ablated, surrounding bone was removed, jaw cysts were extirpated and the missing bone was filled in with the OCP/col composite; finally the gums and periosteum were repositioned and sutured shut. Finally for alveolar cleft cases, OCP/col was placed into the alveolar bone defect and the defect was covered in gingiva and periosteum and sutured shut.

Histological and radiological analysis results were deemed "good" if newly-formed bone was recognized and there were no histological abnormalities and if implant treatment passed six out of six inspections. If the newly formed bone was minimal or unrecognizable, or the histological analysis was abnormal and implants received four or fewer points on the implant inspection; results were deemed "poor". Histological analysis of sinus floor elevation for a patient within the two-stage group showed newly formed bone at the site of OCP/Col implantation and no scar or inflammation cells were found. Table #1 shows the quantitative bone width results for the four different groups within the clinical study.

Table #1: Average vertical Bone Widths Before & 24 weeks Post OCP/Co Treatment

Surgery	Average vertical Bone Width	
Surgery	Pre. OCP/Co Implantation (mm)	24 Weeks Post OCP/Co Implantation (mm)
Sinus Floor Elevation (1-Stage)	4.4 ± 1.3	12.4 ± 2.1
Sinus Floor Elevation (2-Stage)	2.4 ± 1.3	13.0 ± 3.8
Socket Preservation	11.0 ± 7.2	18.9 ± 8.6

=== Case #2 ===
Case study #2 involved three male patients, age 63–77, who had previously undergone sinus or alveolar ridge augmentation with at least one year of functional loading. The three surgeries were performed by a single periodontist, and each participant underwent a different surgery. Patient #1 underwent a bone augmentation of peri-implant defects, Patient #2 underwent a vertical ridge augmentation, and patient #3 underwent a sinus and ridge augmentation.

Patient #1 underwent a three-part implantation in the 44, 45, and 46 regions (1st bicuspid, 2nd bicuspid, and 1st molar of mandibular region). After the implants were inserted, a guided bone regeneration procedure was performed over the peri-implant dehiscence defect utilizing a mix of commercialized OCP synthetic bone substituent (bontree) and whole blood. Four months post implantation, sufficient levels of horizontal bone were observed partially counteracting the initial loss of bone tissue from the peri-implantitis that the patient experienced prior to the study.

Patient #2 also underwent three implantations in the 24, 26, and 27 regions. Prior to implantation, vertical ridge augmentation was performed using bontree mixed with whole blood and a titanium mesh covering. Six months after ridge augmentation, the first stage of the implant was placed; four months after the first implantation, the second implant was placed. Lastly, six months after the second implantation, the prosthetic was loaded.

Patient #3 underwent a three-part implantation procedure. First, sinus augmentation and vertical ridge augmentation were performed using bontree, whole blood, and a titanium d-PTFE membrane for the vertical ridge augmentation. Six months after the augmentations, the first and second implantation were performed in the 16-17 regions after a one-stage implant surgery. Four months after the first implantation surgery, a modified periosteal fenestration was performed due to loss of attached mucosa buccally. Lastly, six months after the second implant operation, the prosthesis was inserted. Histological tests showed the deposition of newly formed bone around the bone grafts and good incorporation of the newly formed bone with the synthetic bone graft. Also, no foreign body reactions or inflammatory problems were detected.

Radiological tests performed after the dental implants for all three patients, showed no immediate postoperative problems with the implants; four months post-operation, showed implant stability levels greater than 60 for all implants. One year after implantation, showed integration of the implants with newly regenerated alveolar bone and no apparent bone loss.
