= DPCA =

DPCA may refer to:

- Democratic Party Committee Abroad, the official organization of the Democratic Party for United States citizens living abroad
- Dicalcium phosphate, the calcium phosphate with the formula CaHPO_{4} and its dihydrate, also called dibasic calcium phosphate anhydrous (DCPA)
- Dongfeng Peugeot-Citroën Automobile, a joint venture between Dongfeng Motor Corporation and Groupe PSA
