= Dental vibration appliance =

Orthodontic treatment device

Dental vibration appliances are devices that aim to speed up the process of straightening teeth or correcting a person's bite during orthodontic treatment. The goal is to reduce the time it often takes to move teeth safely and also reduce the risk of side effects such as problems with normal tooth mineralization and inflammatory root resorption. These devices also aim to improve compliance by shortening the time needed for orthodontic care.

Dental vibration appliances are proposed to work by applying vibration called "micropulses" to dental braces. The goal of this vibration is to stimulate bone cell remodelling and result in faster tooth movement during orthodontic treatment. Evidence as of the effectiveness and safety of this treatment approach is not clear. There is weak evidence to suggest that the vibrational forces associated with these devices does not provide a benefit or reduce the amount of time a person requires orthodontic treatment.
