= Tetracalcium phosphate =

Names
- IUPAC name Tetracalcium oxide diphosphate
- Other names Tetracalcium diphosphorus nonaoxide, tetracalcium oxygen(2-) diphosphate, calcium oxide phosphate, TTCP, TetCP, Thomas phosphate

Identifiers
CAS Number	1306-01-0
3D model (JSmol)	Interactive image
ChemSpider	144479
ECHA InfoCard	100.013.767
EC Number	215-143-6
PubChem CID	164806
UNII	CJ64N85J4S
CompTox Dashboard (EPA)	DTXSID50926827
- InChI: InChI=1S/4Ca.2H3O4P.O/c;;;;2*1-5(2,3)4;/h;;;;2*(H3,1,2,3,4);/q4*+2;;;-2/p-6 Key: GBNXLQPMFAUCOI-UHFFFAOYSA-H
- SMILES: [O-2].[O-]P(=O)([O-])[O-].[O-]P(=O)([O-])[O-].[Ca+2].[Ca+2].[Ca+2].[Ca+2]

Properties
Chemical formula	Ca_{4}(PO_{4})_{2}O
Molar mass	366.254124 g/mol
Appearance	white
Melting point	decomp
- Except where otherwise noted, data are given for materials in their standard state (at 25 °C [77 °F], 100 kPa). Infobox references

Tetracalcium phosphate is the compound Ca_{4}(PO_{4})_{2}O, (4CaO·P_{2}O_{5}). It is the most basic of the calcium phosphates, and has a Ca/P ratio of 2, making it the most phosphorus poor phosphate. It is found as the mineral hilgenstockite, which is formed in industrial phosphate rich slag (called "Thomas slag"). This slag was used as a fertiliser due to the higher solubility of tetracalcium phosphate relative to apatite minerals. Tetracalcium phosphate is a component in some calcium phosphate cements that have medical applications.

== Preparation and reactions ==
Tetracalcium phosphate cannot be prepared in aqueous solution, any precipitates having the correct Ca/P ratio contain hydroxide ions in apatitic phases. Solid state reactions are used, one example is:

2 CaHPO_{4} + 2 CaCO_{3} → Ca_{4}(PO_{4})_{2}O + CO_{2} + H_{2}O (1450-1500 °C for up to 12 hours)

As tetracalcium phosphate is metastable the molten reaction mixture has to be quenched to rapidly, reduce the temperature and prevent the formation of other compounds such as Ca_{3}(PO_{4})_{2}, CaO, CaCO_{3} and Ca_{5}(PO_{4})_{3}(OH).

Unwanted tetracalcium phosphate can be formed when metal alloy implants (orthopaedic and dental) are plasma sprayed with hydroxyapatite.

Tetracalcium phosphate is stable in water at room temperature for up to four weeks, but at higher temperatures hydrolyses to hydroxyapatite and calcium hydroxide:

3 Ca_{4}(PO_{4})_{2}O + 3 H_{2}O → 2 Ca_{5}(PO_{4})_{3}(OH) + 2 Ca(OH)_{2}

Tetracalcium phosphate is a component used in the formation of some hydroxyapatite calcium phosphate cements that used for the repair of bone defects. One example of a hydroxyapatite cement forming reaction is that of tetracalcium phosphate and dicalcium diphosphate dihydrate:

Ca_{4}(PO_{4})_{2}O + CaHPO_{4}·2H_{2}O → Ca_{5}(PO_{4})_{3}(OH) + 2 H_{2}O

== Structure ==
Crystalline tetracalcium phosphate is monoclinic, and has close similarities to hydroxyapatite. The similarity is such that it has been suggested that there is an epitactic relationship between the structures enabling direct conversion of tetracalcium phosphate to hydroxyapatite.
