= Calcium phosphate =

Chemical compound

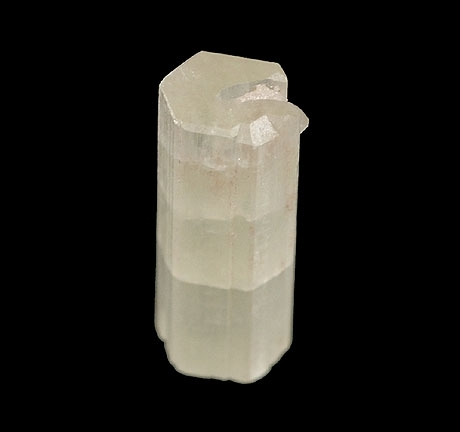
- Hydroxyapatite crystal

Identifiers
CAS Number	7758-87-4
ECHA InfoCard	100.030.244
EC Number	233-283-6
E number	E341 (antioxidants, ...)
PubChem CID	24456
UNII	K4C08XP666
CompTox Dashboard (EPA)	DTXSID40893099
- InChI: Key: QORWJWZARLRLPR-UHFFFAOYSA-H

Properties
Chemical formula	Ca_{3}(PO_{4})_{2}
Molar mass	310.18 g/mol
Appearance	White Solid
Odor	Odorless
Density	3.14 g/cu cm
Melting point	1,670 °C (3,040 °F; 1,940 K)
Solubility in water	Practically insoluble with water
Solubility in Ethanol	Insoluble with ethanol (also acetic acid)

Hazards
- GHS labelling
Pictograms	(GHS07: Exclamation mark)
Signal word	Warning
Hazard statements	H315, H319, H335
Precautionary statements	P101, P102, P103, P261, P264, P270, P271, P280, P302+P352, P304+P340, P305+P351+P338
NFPA 704 (fire diamond)	2 0 1
Flash point	Non-flammable
Safety data sheet (SDS)	fishersci.com
- Except where otherwise noted, data are given for materials in their standard state (at 25 °C [77 °F], 100 kPa). Infobox references

The term calcium phosphate refers to a family of materials and minerals containing calcium ions (Ca^{2+}) together with inorganic phosphate anions (PO^{3−}_{4}). Some so-called calcium phosphates contain oxide and hydroxide as well. Calcium phosphates are white solids of nutritional value and are found in many living organisms, e.g., bone mineral and tooth enamel. In milk, it exists in a colloidal form in micelles bound to casein protein with magnesium, zinc, and citrate–collectively referred to as colloidal calcium phosphate (CCP). Various calcium phosphate minerals, which often are not white owing to impurities, are used in the production of phosphoric acid and fertilizers. Overuse of certain forms of calcium phosphate can lead to nutrient-containing surface runoff and subsequent adverse effects upon receiving waters such as algal blooms and eutrophication (over-enrichment with nutrients and minerals).

== Orthophosphates, di- and monohydrogen phosphates ==
These materials contain Ca^{2+} combined with PO^{3−}_{4}, HPO^{2−}_{4}, or H_{2}PO^{−}_{4}:

- Monocalcium phosphate, E341 (CAS# 7758-23-8 for anhydrous; CAS#10031-30-8 for monohydrate: Ca(H_{2}PO_{4})_{2} and Ca(H_{2}PO_{4})_{2}(H_{2}O)
- Dicalcium phosphate (dibasic calcium phosphate), E341(ii) (CAS# 7757–93–9): CaHPO_{4} (mineral: monetite), dihydrate CaHPO_{4}(H_{2}O)_{2} (mineral: brushite) and monohydrate CaHPO_{4}(H_{2}O)
- Tricalcium phosphate (tribasic calcium phosphate or tricalcic phosphate, sometimes referred to as calcium phosphate or calcium orthophosphate, whitlockite), E341(iii) (CAS#7758-87-4): Ca_{3}(PO_{4})_{2}
- Octacalcium phosphate (CAS# 13767–12–9): Ca_{8}H_{2}(PO_{4})_{6}·5H_{2}O
- Amorphous calcium phosphate is a glassy precipitate of variable composition that may be present in biological systems.

== Di- and polyphosphates ==
These materials contain Ca(2+) combined with the polyphosphates, such as P_{2}O^{4−}_{7} and triphosphate P_{3}O^{5−}_{10}:

- Dicalcium diphosphate (CAS#7790-76-3]: Ca_{2}P_{2}O_{7}
- Calcium triphosphate (CAS# 26158–70–3): Ca_{5}(P_{3}O_{10})_{2}

== Hydroxy- and oxo-phosphates ==
These materials contain other anions in addition to phosphate:

- Hydroxyapatite Ca_{5}(PO_{4})_{3}(OH)
- Apatite Ca_{10}(PO_{4})_{6}(OH,F,Cl,Br)_{2}
- Tetracalcium phosphate (CAS#1306-01-0): Ca_{4}(PO_{4})_{2}O

== Culinary use ==
Calcium phosphate was approved by the FDA in the US for use as a white food coloring because of a 2023 petition from Innophos Inc. of Cranbury, New Jersey.

== Clinical significance ==
Calcium phosphate stones account for approximately 15% of kidney stone disease. Calcium phosphate stones tend to grow in alkaline urine, especially when Proteus bacteria are present. It is the most common type in pregnant women.

Calcium phosphate is the usual constitution of microcalcifications of the breast, particularly dystrophic calcifications. Microcalcifications as can be seen on mammography can be an early sign of breast cancer. Based on morphology, it is possible to classify by radiography how likely microcalcifications are to indicate cancer.

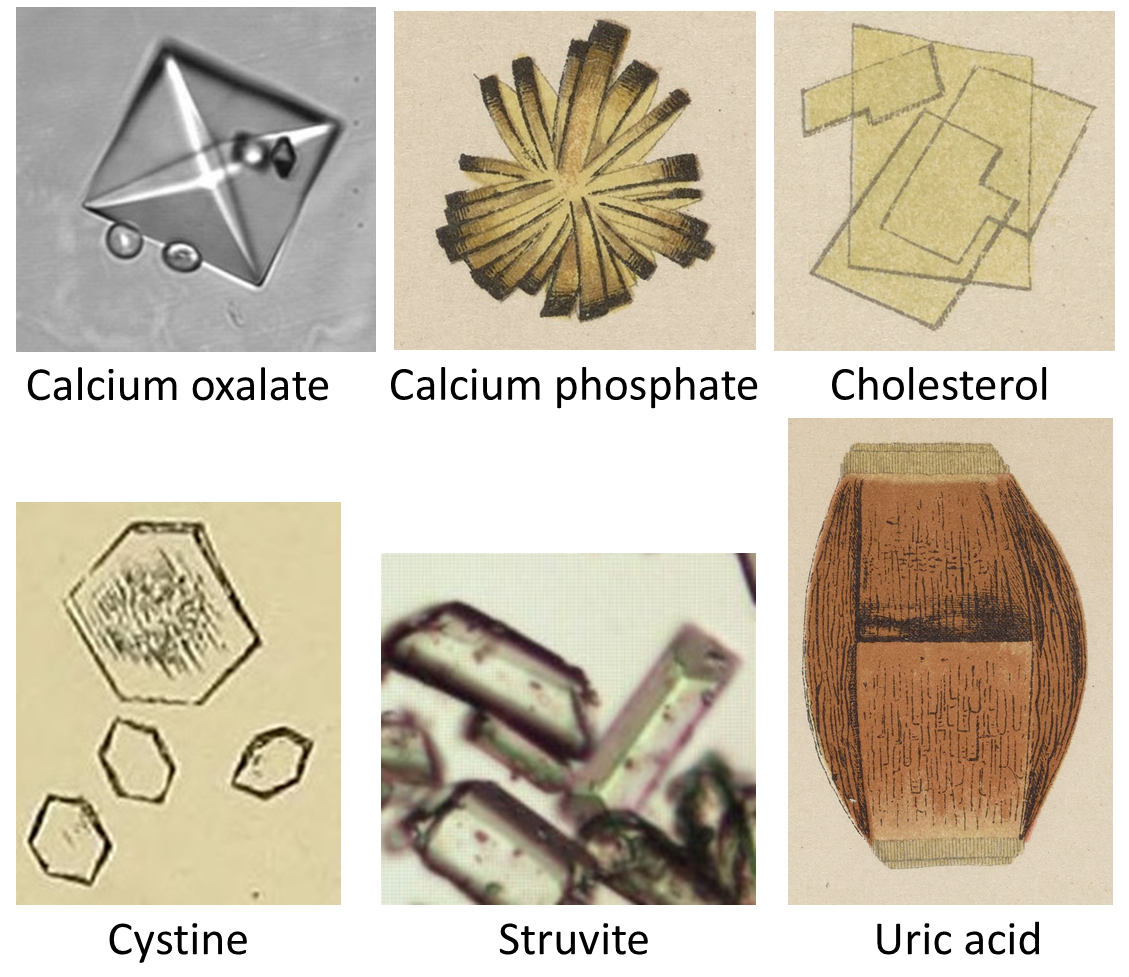
Urine crystals comparison, with calcium phosphate crystal depicted at top center.

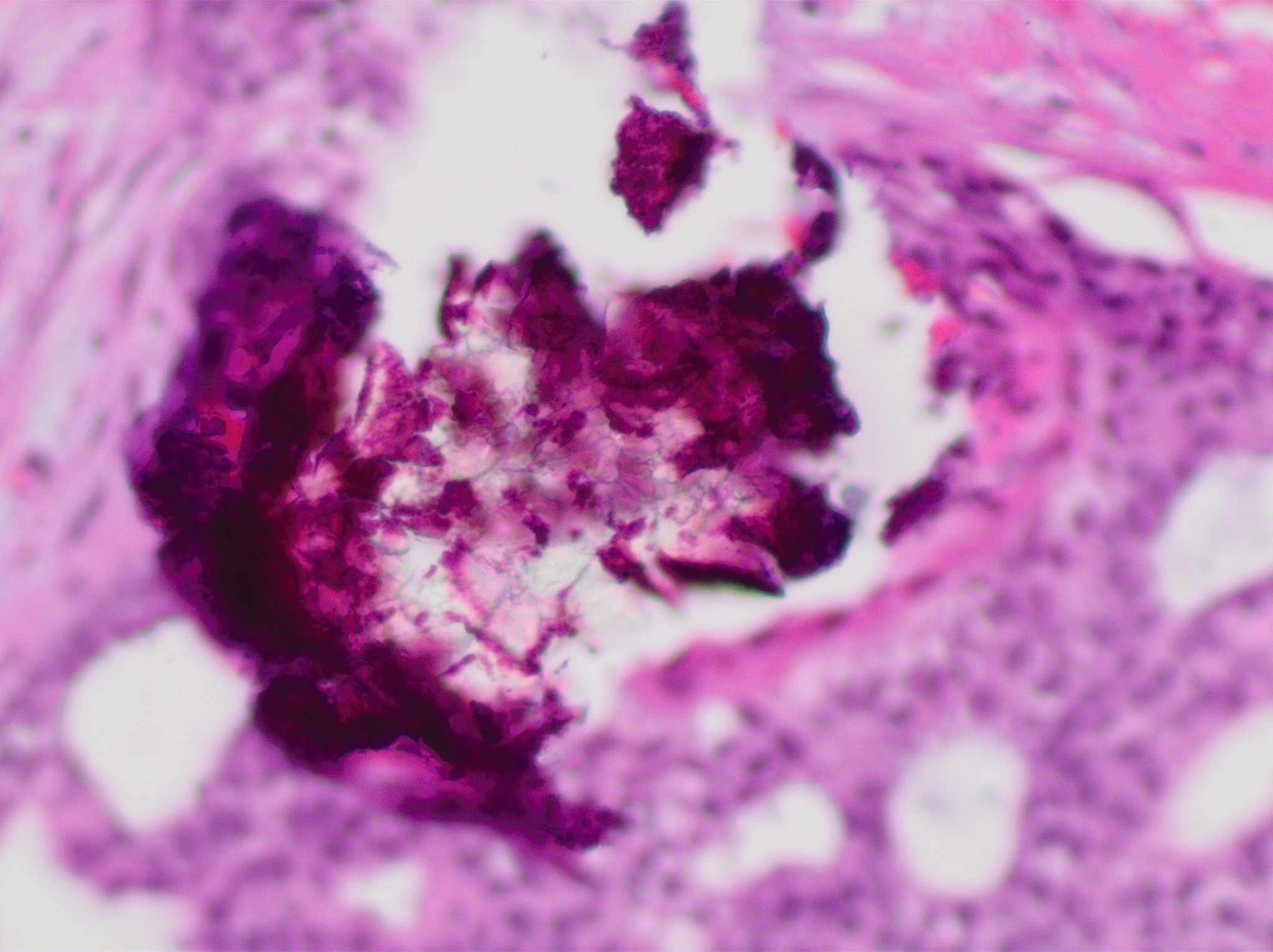
Histopathology of dystrophic calcium phosphate microcalcifications in ductal carcinoma in situ (DCIS) of the breast, H&E stain.
