= Dental pellicle =

Protein film on the teeth

The dental pellicle, or acquired pellicle, is a protein film that forms on the surface enamel, dentin, artificial crowns, and bridges by selective binding of glycoproteins from saliva that prevents continuous deposition of salivary calcium phosphate. It forms in seconds after a tooth is cleaned, or after chewing. It protects the tooth from the acids produced by oral microorganisms after consuming carbohydrates.

== Stages ==
=== Pellicle ===
The surface of enamel and dentin attracts salivary glycoproteins and bacterial products creating the pellicle layer. This thin layer forms on the surface of the enamel within minutes of its exposure. These glycoproteins include proline-rich proteins that allow bacterial adhesion.

Pellicle somewhat protects enamel, but not dentin, from acid and abrasion.

=== Plaque formation ===
Plaque is a biofilm composed of several different kinds of bacteria and their products that develop over the enamel on the pellicle. Plaque formation takes several days to weeks and will cause the surrounding environment to become acidic, if not removed.

=== First bacteria ===
The first bacteria to attach to these pellicle glycoproteins are gram-positive, aerobic cocci such as Streptococcus sanguinis. These bacteria are able to replicate in the oxygen-rich environment of the oral cavity and form micro-colonies minutes after attachment.

=== Later bacteria ===
Other bacteria, including Streptococcus mutans, are able to grow in these colonies. Streptococcus mutans is important, because it is associated with dental caries. These bacteria produce the enzyme glucosyltransferase. Glucosyl transferase converts sucrose into exopolysaccharides. These exopolysaccharides create a sticky environment that allows other bacteria to attach to the initial colonies and protect them from acids. As the plaque develops and expands, oxygen can no longer diffuse into the colonies.

After a few days, anaerobic, gram-negative cocci, rods, and filaments begin to colonize the plaque. After several weeks, the cocci, rods, and filaments grow together forming colonies known as corncobs. This anaerobic environment causes facultative anaerobes such as S. mutans and Lactobacilli to break down sucrose through fermentation pathways. These bacteria produce lactic acid as a metabolic byproduct. If the concentration of lactic acid becomes high enough, the pH around the plaque will drop below 5.5, and demineralization will occur.
