= Amorphous calcium phosphate =

Chemical substance

Amorphous calcium phosphate (ACP) is a glassy solid that is formed from the chemical decomposition of a mixture of dissolved phosphate and calcium salts (e.g. (NH_{4})_{2}HPO_{4} + Ca(NO_{3})_{2}). The resulting amorphous mixture consists mostly of calcium and phosphate, but also contains varying amounts of water and hydrogen and hydroxide ions, depending on the synthesis conditions. Such mixtures are also known as calcium phosphate cement.

ACP is generally categorized into either "amorphous tricalcium phosphate" (ATCP) or calcium-deficient hydroxyapatite (CDHA). CDHA is sometimes termed "apatitic calcium triphosphate." The composition of amorphous calcium phosphate is Ca_{x}H_{y}(PO_{4})_{z}·nH_{2}O, where n is between 3 and 4.5. CDHA has a general formula of Ca_{9}(HPO_{4})(PO_{4})_{5}(OH). Precipitation from a moderately supersaturated and basic solution of a magnesium salt produces amorphous magnesium calcium phosphate (AMCP), in which magnesium incorporated into the ACP structure.

A commercial preparation of ACP is casein phosphopeptide-amorphous calcium phosphate (CPP-ACP), derived from cow milk. It is sold under various brand names including Recaldent and Tooth Mousse, intended to be applied directly to teeth. Its clinical usefulness is unproven.

== Biogenic ACP ==
Biogenic ACP has been found in the inner ear of embryonic sharks, mammalian milk and dental enamel. However, whilst its unequivocal presence in bones and teeth is debated, there is evidence that transient amorphous precursors are involved in the development of bone and teeth. The ACP in bovine milk (CPP-ACP) is believed to involve calcium phosphate nanoclusters in a shell of casein phosphopeptides. A typical casein micelle of radius 100 nm contains around 10,000 casein molecules and 800 nanoclusters of ACP, each about 4.8 nm in diameter. The concentration of calcium phosphate is higher in milk than in serum, but it rarely forms deposits of insoluble phosphates. Unfolded phosphopeptides are believed to sequester ACP nanoclusters and form stable complexes in other biofluids such as urine and blood serum, preventing deposition of insoluble calcium phosphates and calcification of soft tissue. In the laboratory, stored samples of formulations of artificial blood, serum, urine and milk (which approximate the pH of the naturally occurring fluid) deposit insoluble phosphates. The addition of suitable phosphopeptides prevents precipitation.

== Posner's clusters ==
Following investigations into the composition of amorphous calcium phosphates precipitated under different conditions, Posner and Betts suggested in the mid-1970s that the structural unit of ACP was a neutral cluster Ca_{9}(PO_{4})_{6}. Calculations support the description of a cluster with central Ca^{2+} ion surrounded by six phosphate PO_{4}^{3−} anions, which in turn are surrounded by eight further calcium ions. The resulting cluster is estimated to have a diameter of around 950 pm (0.95 nm). These are now generally referred to as Posner's clusters. Precipitated ACP is believed to be made up of particles containing a number of Posner's clusters with water in the intervening spaces. While plasma spray coated ACP may contain Posner's clusters, there cannot be any water present. New studies propose the idea of posner clusters acting as neural qbits because their entangled ^{31}P have a long relaxation time and are in a S_{6} symmetry. The idea behind it is that the posner molecules meld and release calcium-ions which stimulises the neurons.

== Use in dental treatment ==
Amorphous calcium phosphate in combination with casein phosphopeptide has been used as a dental treatment to treat incipient dental decay. ACP sees its main use as an occluding agent, which aids in reducing sensitivity. Studies have shown that it does form a remineralized phase of hydroxyapatite consistent with the natural enamel. In addition, clinical studies have shown that patients who whiten their teeth have reduced sensitivity after treatment. It is believed that ACP hydrolyzes under physiological temperatures and pH to form octacalcium phosphate as an intermediate, and then surface apatite.

== Method of mineralization ==
ACP lacks the long-range, periodic atomic-scale order of crystalline calcium phosphates. The X-ray diffraction pattern is broad and diffuse with a maximum at $2\theta = 25^\circ$, and no other different features compared with well-crystallized hydroxyapatite. Under electron microscopy, its morphological form is shown as small spheroidal particles in the scale of tenths nanometer. In aqueous media, ACP is easily transformed into crystalline phases such as octacalcium phosphate and apatite due to the growing of microcrystallites. It has been demonstrated that ACP has better osteoconductivity and biodegradability than tricalcium phosphate and hydroxyapatite in vivo.

Moreover, it can increase alkaline phosphatase activities of mesoblasts, enhance cell proliferation and promote cell adhesion. The unique role of ACP during the formation of mineralized tissues makes it a promising candidate material for tissue repair and regeneration. ACP may also be a potential remineralizing agent in dental applications. Recently developed ACP-filled bioactive composites are believed to be effective anti-demineralizing/remineralizing agents for the preservation and repair of tooth structures.

== See also ==
- Remineralisation of teeth
