= Whitlockite =

Phosphate mineral

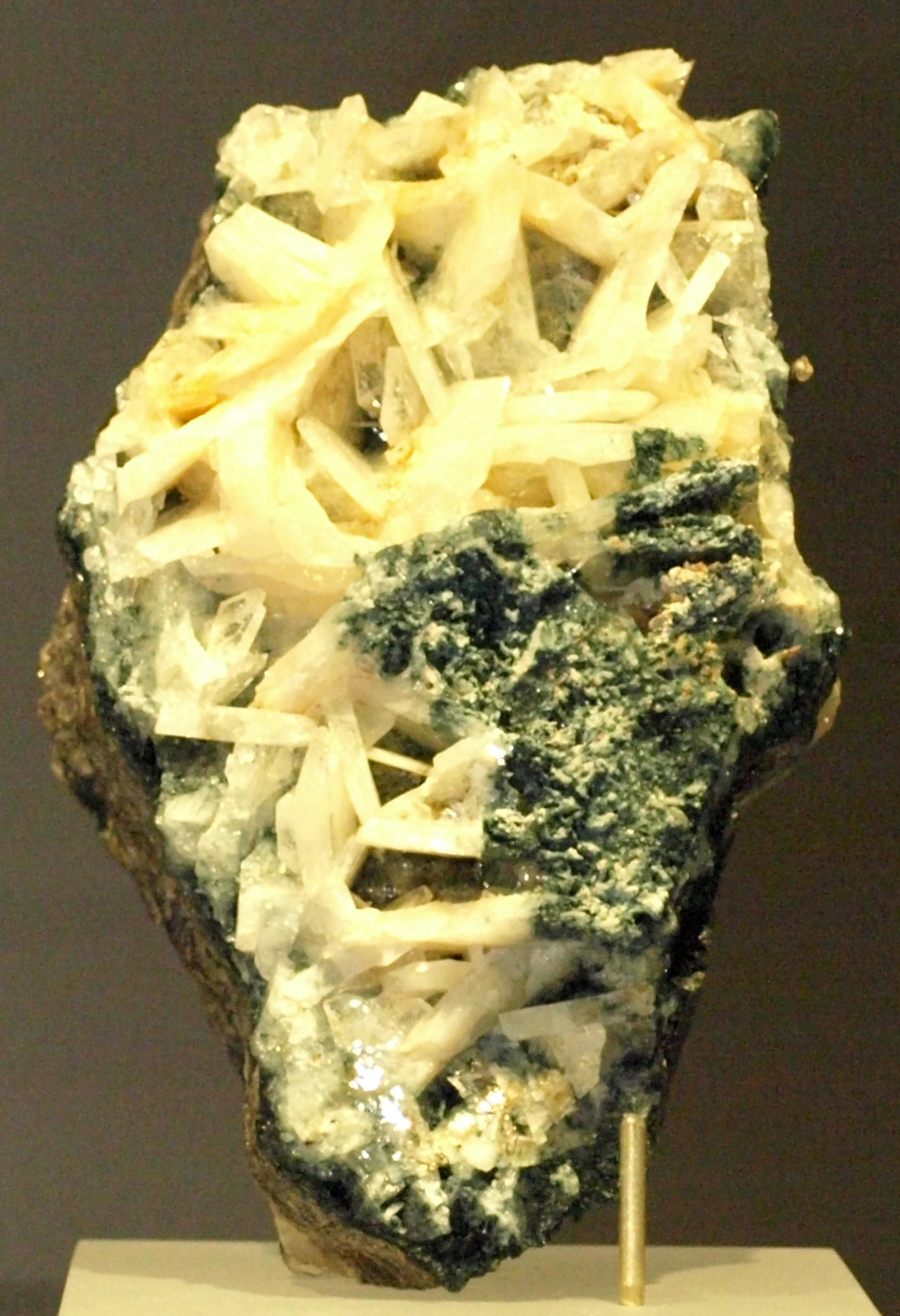
- An example of the mineral whitlockite on display at the Royal Ontario Museum.

General
- Category: Phosphate minerals
- Formula: Ca_{9}(Mg,Fe++)(PO_{4})_{6}(PO_{3}OH)
- IMA symbol: Wht
- Strunz classification: 8.AC.45
- Crystal system: Trigonal
- Crystal class: Ditrigonal pyramidal (3m); H-M symbol: (3m)
- Space group: R3c
- Unit cell: a = 10.33, c = 37.103(5) [Å]; Z = 3

Identification
- Color: Colorless, gray-white, light pink, light yellow
- Crystal habit: rhombohedral crystals, often tabular, massive, microcrystalline crusts and as "cave pearls"
- Cleavage: None
- Fracture: Brittle
- Tenacity: Brittle
- Mohs scale hardness: 5
- Luster: Vitreous to resinous
- Streak: White
- Diaphaneity: Transparent
- Density: 3.13
- Optical properties: Uniaxial (−)
- Refractive index: nω = 1.629 nε = 1.626
- Birefringence: δ = 0.003
- Other characteristics: Piezoelectric and pyroelectric

Whitlockite is a mineral, an uncommon form of calcium phosphate. Its formula is Ca_{9}(MgFe)(PO_{4})_{6}PO_{3}OH. It is a relatively rare mineral but is found in granitic pegmatites, phosphate rock deposits, guano caves and in chondrite meteorites. It was first described in 1941 and named for Herbert Percy Whitlock (1868–1948), American mineralogist and curator at the American Museum of Natural History in New York City.

With regard to periodontal dentistry, magnesium whitlockite comprises one component of many of the inorganic content of calculus. It is found primarily in subgingival calculus (as opposed to supragingival calculus). It is also found more in posterior as opposed to anterior regions of the oral cavity.

== Historical evolution as distinct minerals ==
Whitlockite is a member of the phosphate group of minerals with three distinct occurrences. For many years, these occurrences were thought to be identical. However, recent studies using x-ray and electron diffraction have been able to identify compositional differences that separate one type of whitlockite from another. There are two inorganic occurrences of whitlockite that differ chiefly by the presence or absence of hydrogen. This difference was not initially observed due to technical limitations, such as small crystal size. Although the identity of the "true" whitlockite is still debated, efforts are now being made to officially distinguish terrestrial whitlockite from its phase in meteorites as two distinct minerals. Whitlockite can also be found in different types of biological deposits. Organic instances of whitlockite are virtually identical in composition, but typically contain magnesium, which further distinguishes them from inorganic instances of this mineral. Magnesium whitlockite has been implicated in different disease states and is currently being studied for use in the fabrication of human prosthetics.

The phosphate group is part of the largest class of minerals and consists of 763 known species. Of these, the most common phosphate mineral is apatite, which is frequently found as an accessory mineral in many types of rock, including igneous and metamorphic rocks. Apatite has also been found in hydrothermal veins and cavities or even Alpine-type veins associated with quartz. The most important varieties of apatite are represented by fluorapatite, hydroxyapatite, chlorapatite and carbonate-apatite Because the composition of apatite varies, the term 'apatite' is often used to describe a variety of different phosphate minerals. Apatite are also commonly found in biologic systems, where they are a frequent component of structures such as bone. Whitlockite is a rare phosphate mineral often represented as a type of apatite. However, it differs considerably from most other phosphate minerals, including apatite, in its chemical composition and the molar proportions of these components. The first serious studies of the mineral whitlockite were launched in 1952 on terrestrial specimens from the Palermo pegmatite quarry near North Groton, New Hampshire. These specimens were initially used to describe the composition and structure of the mineral. A decade later, the Apollo landing missions returned an impressive array of lunar rocks as well as other kinds of meteoric material. This unique resource led to an unprecedented barrage of geologic studies designed to characterize and define the composition and structure of minerals in these specimens. Throughout all studies on whitlockite, it has been found that the two most common phosphate minerals occurring in lunar rocks were apatite and whitlockite, and that they usually occur together. In the biologic literature, whitlockite and apatite are use interchangeably. Whitlockite is also associated so frequently with apatite in its biologic occurrences that it is frequently presumed to be apatite.

Bobdownsite is a variety of whitlockite from Yukon, Canada, that was thought to contain fluorine bonded directly to phosphorus, giving it the chemical formula Ca_{9}(Mg)(PO_{4})_{6}(PO_{3}F) However, subsequent investigation failed to find any monofluorophosphate in samples of bobdownsite, the mineral was discredited as a distinct species, and recommendations were made to tighten the criteria for identifying minerals as containing monofluorophosphate.

== Geological occurrences ==
Whitlockite has two inorganic occurrences with geologic significance. The first, known as terrestrial whitlockite, is found as a secondary mineral in granite pegmatites in such areas as Custer County, South Dakota, as dine crystals associated with quartz at the Tip Top mine, and at the Palermo mine in North Groton, New Hampshire. The second occurrence is extraterrestrial whitlockite, which is now known as merrillite. Extraterrestrial whitlockite has been identified in lunar samples as well as martian and other types of meteorites, where it is one of the most common phosphate minerals. Studies of merrillite as an accessory mineral have provided valuable insights that have helped to unlock the petrogenesis of extraterrestrial rocks.

== Biological occurrences ==
Whitlockite can also be found in biological systems and has been implicated in several human diseases. Whitlockite can be found at many sites in the human body, but is particularly concentrated in calcified tissues, such as embryonic and adult bone. The highest concentrations of whitlockite appear in the weight bearing area of the femoral head. Traces of whitlockite have also been found in tuberculous lesions, urinary calculi and even prostatic deposits. Whitlockite can also be found in the oral cavity, where it is a primary component of dental calculi and salivary stones. Lastly, whitlockite can be found in aortic media, where it may be involved in arteriosclerosis. The presence of whitlockite at these places has not attracted much attention from biomedical scientists or clinicians, chiefly because whitlockite is not visible with the stains used to routinely examine microscopic sections of healthy or diseased tissue. However, the presence of whitlockite becomes obvious when X-ray diffraction is used to examine these sections. In part, whitlockite occurs commonly in biologic systems because of the high concentrations of proteolipids and divalent cations in biologic fluids. Formation of this type of whitlockite is magnesium rich, and is preferred at temperatures typical of biologic systems because of the smaller diameter of the magnesium ion compared to calcium.

== Physical properties ==
Each of the phases of whitlockite described above exhibit approximately the same physical properties. They display no cleavage, fracture subconchoidal to uneven, and tend to be brittle. They are classified with a hardness of 5 and a density of 3.12 g/cm^{3}. Color varieties are colorless, white, gray, yellowish or pinkish, and can be transparent to translucent. Whitlockites exhibit a vitreous to resinous luster. The typical habit of whitlockite is rhombohedral crystals, but whitlockite can also rarely be tabular. The crystal habit of whitlockite also ranges from coarse granular to earthy.

== See also ==
- List of minerals
- List of minerals named after people
