= Dimagnesium phosphate =

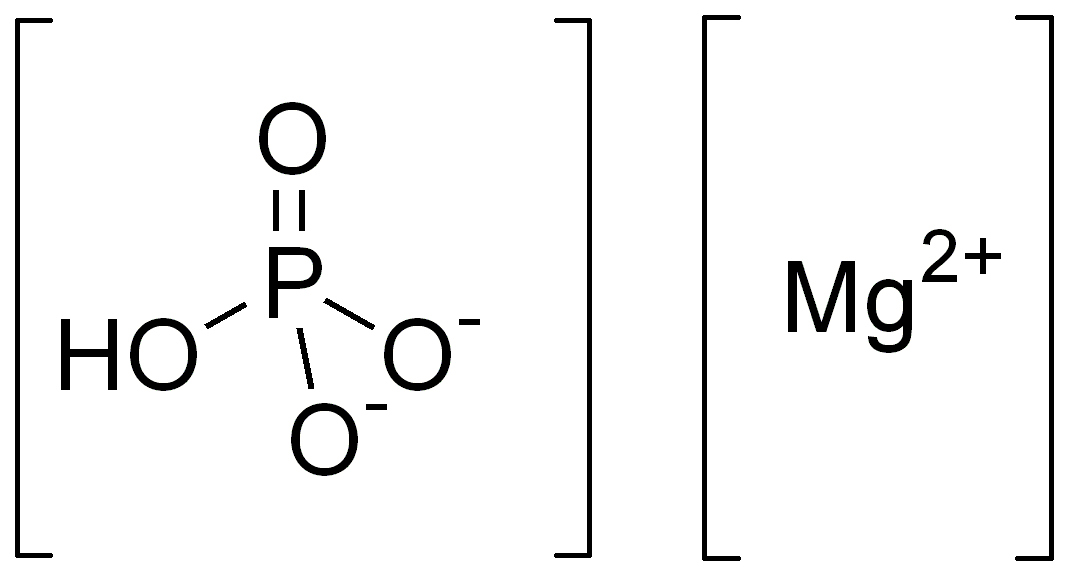

Names
- Other names Magnesium hydrogen phosphate; Magnesium phosphate dibasic

Identifiers
| CAS Number | 7757-86-0; 7782-75-4 (trihydrate) |
| 3D model (JSmol) | Interactive image |
| ChEBI | CHEBI:747292 |
| ChemSpider | 110477 |
| ECHA InfoCard | 100.028.930 |
| EC Number | 231-823-5 |
| E number | E343(ii) (antioxidants, ...) |
| PubChem CID | 123955 |
| UNII | A1Y870209Z; HF539G9L3Q (trihydrate) |
| CompTox Dashboard (EPA) | DTXSID00872522 |
- InChI: InChI=1S/Mg.H3O4P/c;1-5(2,3)4/h;(H3,1,2,3,4)/q+2;/p-2 Key: MHJAJDCZWVHCPF-UHFFFAOYSA-L
- SMILES: O=P([O-])(O)[O-].[Mg+2]

Properties
| Chemical formula | HMgO_{4}P |
| Molar mass | 120.283 g·mol^{−1} |
| Density | 2.13 g/cm3 (trihydrate) |

Hazards
| NFPA 704 (fire diamond) | 0 0 0 |
- Except where otherwise noted, data are given for materials in their standard state (at 25 °C [77 °F], 100 kPa). verify (what is ?) Infobox references

Dimagnesium phosphate is a compound with formula MgHPO_{4}. It is a Mg^{2+} salt of monohydrogen phosphate. The trihydrate is well known, occurring as the mineral newberyite.

It can be formed by reaction of stoichiometric quantities of magnesium oxide with phosphoric acid.

MgO + H_{3}PO_{4} → MgHPO_{4} + H_{2}O

If monomagnesium phosphate is dissolved in water, it forms phosphoric acid and deposits a solid precipitate of dimagnesium phosphate trihydrate:

Mg(H_{2}PO_{4})_{2} + 3 H_{2}O → Mg(HPO_{4})^{.}3H_{2}O + H_{3}PO_{4}

The compound is used as a nutritional supplement, especially for infants and athletes. Its E number is E343.

== See also ==
- Magnesium phosphate
