= Francolite =

Phosphate mineral

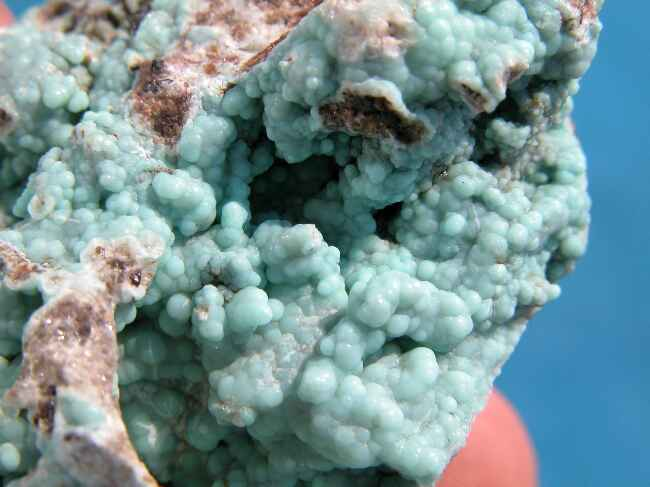
- Francolite found in Russia

General
- Category: Phosphate minerals
- Formula: (Ca,Mg,Sr,Na)_{10}(PO_{4},SO_{4},CO_{3})_{6}F_{2−3}

Francolite is a carbonate rich variety of the mineral fluorapatite and is present in most sedimentary phosphorites. It has a variable chemical composition which can be represented by (Ca,Mg,Sr,Na)_{10}(PO_{4},SO_{4},CO_{3})_{6}F_{2−3}. The mineral was named after its occurrence at Wheal Franco, Whitchurch, Tavistock District, Devon, England.
