= Monomagnesium phosphate =

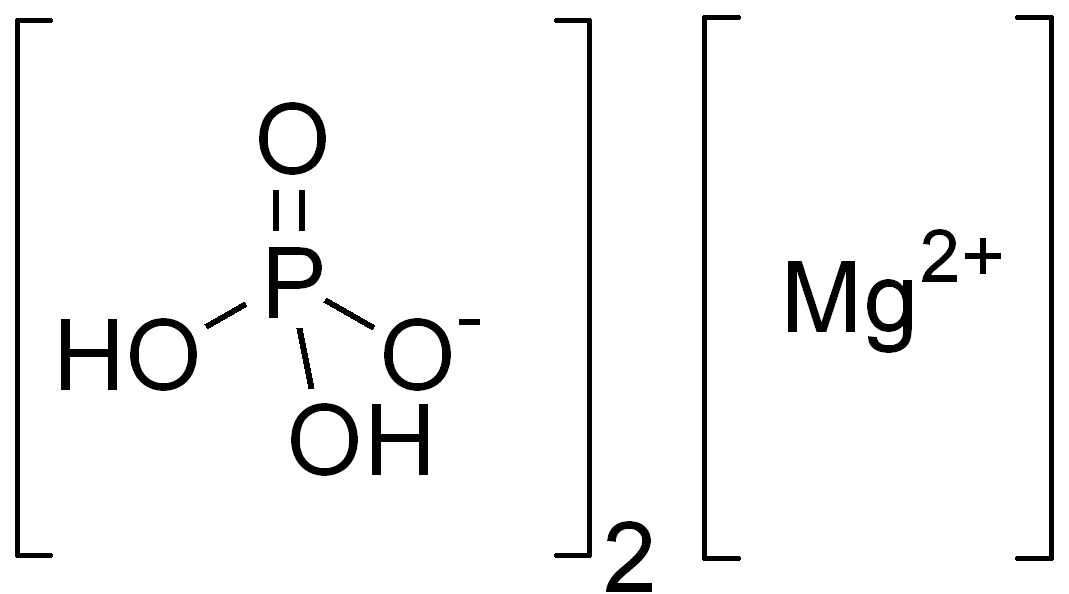

Names
- Other names Monomagnesium orthophosphate; Magnesium dihydrogen phosphate; Magnesium phosphate monobasic; Magnesium biphosphate; Acid magnesium phosphate

Identifiers
CAS Number	13092-66-5 (Anhydrous); 15609-80-0 (Dihydrate); 15609-87-7 (Tetrahydrate)
3D model (JSmol)	Interactive image
ChEBI	CHEBI:747293
ChemSpider	451008
ECHA InfoCard	100.032.716
E number	E343(i) (antioxidants, ...)
PubChem CID	516950
UNII	AA2L7VX59K (Anhydrous); H3992158BT (Dihydrate); XG6J0SHI70 (Tetrahydrate)
CompTox Dashboard (EPA)	DTXSID00872542
- InChI: InChI=1S/Mg.2H3O4P/c;2*1-5(2,3)4/h;2*(H3,1,2,3,4)/q+2;;/p-2 Key: QQFLQYOOQVLGTQ-UHFFFAOYSA-L; InChI=1/Mg.2H3O4P/c;2*1-5(2,3)4/h;2*(H3,1,2,3,4)/q+2;;/p-2 Key: QQFLQYOOQVLGTQ-NUQVWONBAA
- SMILES: OP(=O)(O)[O-].OP(=O)(O)[O-].[Mg+2]

Properties
Chemical formula	H_{4}MgO_{8}P_{2}
Molar mass	218.277 g·mol^{−1}
Appearance	White, odorless, crystalline powder
- Except where otherwise noted, data are given for materials in their standard state (at 25 °C [77 °F], 100 kPa). verify (what is ?) Infobox references

Monomagnesium phosphate is one of the forms of magnesium phosphate. It is a magnesium acid salt of phosphoric acid with the chemical formula Mg(H_{2}PO_{4})_{2}.
Di- and tetrahydrates are known also. It dissolves in water, forming phosphoric acid and depositing a solid precipitate of Mg(HPO_{4})·3H_{2}O, dimagnesium phosphate.

As a food additive, it is used as an acidity regulator and has the E number E343.
