= Magnesium phosphate =

Any magnesium salt of phosphoric acid

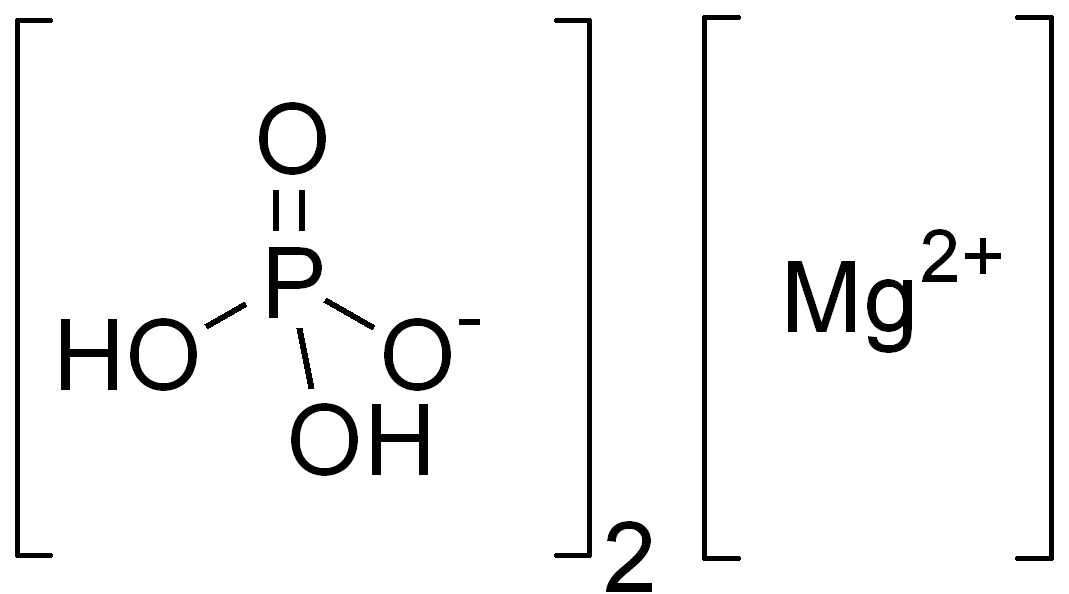
Magnesium phosphate monobasic

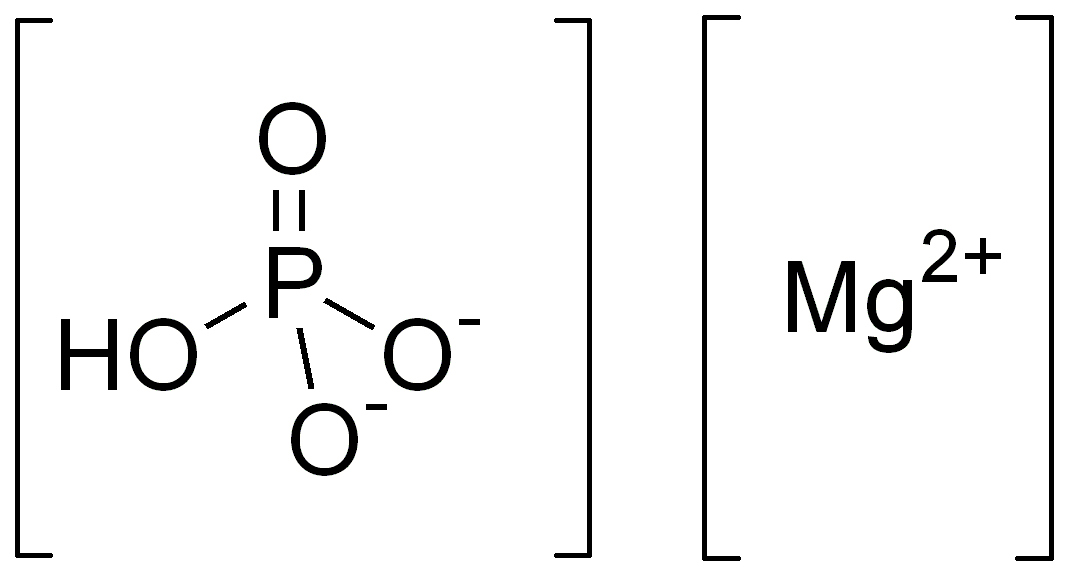
Magnesium phosphate dibasic

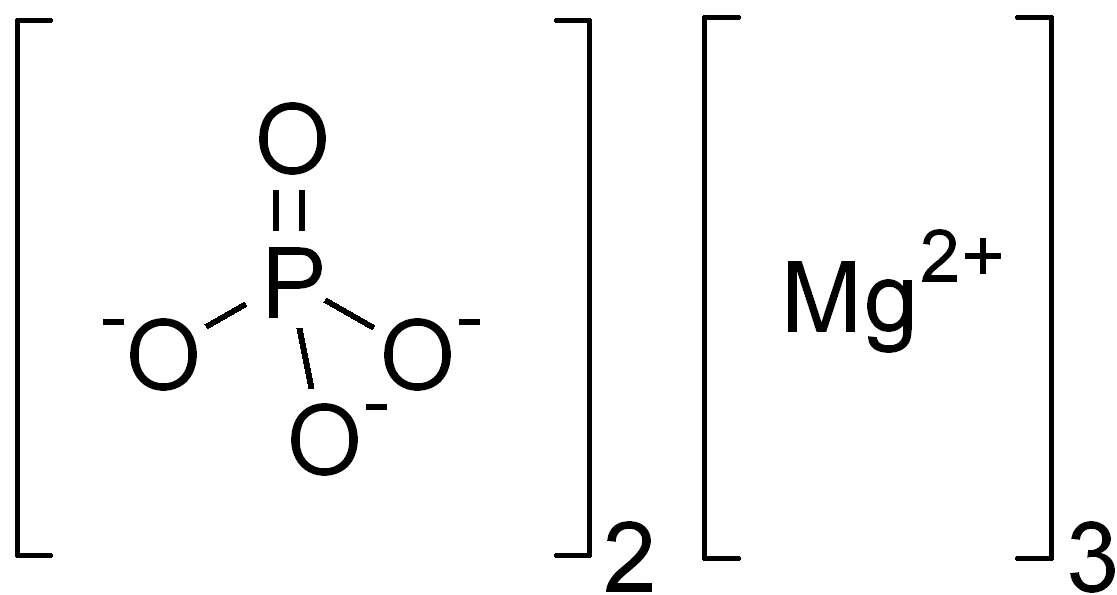
Magnesium phosphate tribasic

Magnesium phosphate is a general term for salts of magnesium and phosphate appearing in several forms and several hydrates:

- Monomagnesium phosphate: Mg(H_{2}PO_{4})_{2}·nH_{2}O
- Dimagnesium phosphate: Mg(HPO_{4})·nH_{2}O
- Trimagnesium phosphate: Mg_{3}(PO_{4})_{2}·nH_{2}O

Amorphous magnesium phosphate is also claimed.

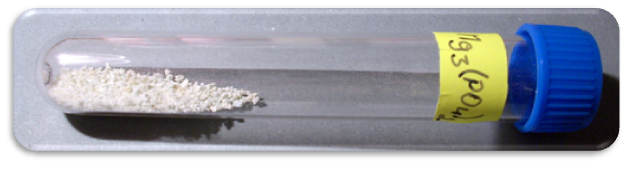
Trimagnesium phosphate.

== Safety ==
Magnesium phosphates are listed on the U.S. FDA's Generally recognized as safe (GRAS) list of substances.

== See also ==
- Ammonium magnesium phosphate
