= Brushite =

Calcium phosphate mineral

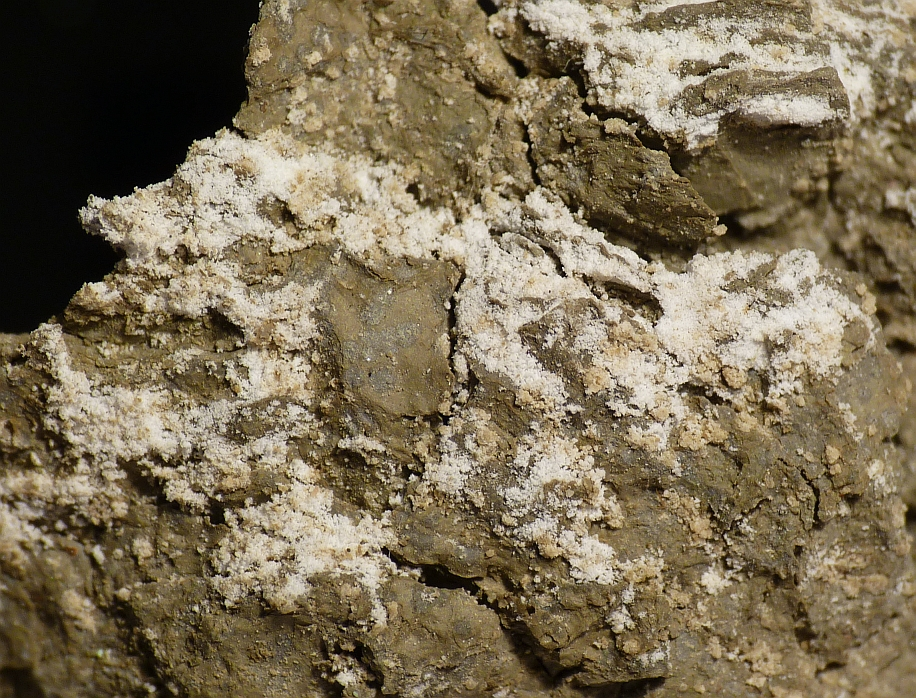
- Brushite (white) on montmorillonite

General
- Category: Phosphate mineral
- Formula: CaHPO_{4} · 2 H_{2}O
- IMA symbol: Bsh
- Strunz classification: 8.CJ.50
- Crystal system: Monoclinic
- Space group: Ia (no. 9)
- Unit cell: a = 6.265 Å, b = 15.19 Å, c = 5.814 Å; β = 116.47°; Z = 4

Identification
- Color: Colorless to pale or ivory-yellow
- Crystal habit: Prismatic to tabular acicular crystals; typically powdery or earthy
- Cleavage: Perfect on {010} and {001}
- Tenacity: Brittle
- Mohs scale hardness: 2.5
- Luster: Vitreous, pearly on cleavages
- Diaphaneity: Transparent to translucent
- Specific gravity: 2.328
- Optical properties: Biaxial (+)
- Refractive index: n_{α} = 1.539 – 1.540 n_{β} = 1.544 – 1.546 n_{γ} = 1.551 – 1.552
- Birefringence: δ = 0.012
- 2V angle: Measured: 59 to 87°
- Solubility: Readily in HCl
- Other characteristics: Piezoelectric

Brushite is a phosphate mineral with the chemical formula CaHPO_{4}·2H_{2}O. Crystals of the pure compound belong to the monoclinic space group C2/c and are colorless. It is the phosphate analogue of the arsenate pharmacolite.

== Discovery and occurrence ==
Brushite was first described in 1865 as an occurrence on Aves Island, Nueva Esparta, Venezuela, and named for the American mineralogist George Jarvis Brush (1831–1912). It is believed to be a precursor of apatite and is found in guano-rich caves, formed by the interaction of guano with calcite and clay at a low pH. It occurs in phosphorite deposits and forms encrustations on old bones. It may result from the runoff of fields which have received heavy fertilizer applications. Associated minerals include taranakite, ardealite, hydroxylapatite, variscite and gypsum.

Brushite is the original precipitating material in calcium phosphate kidney stones. It is also one of the minerals present in dental calculi.
