= Tricalcium phosphate =

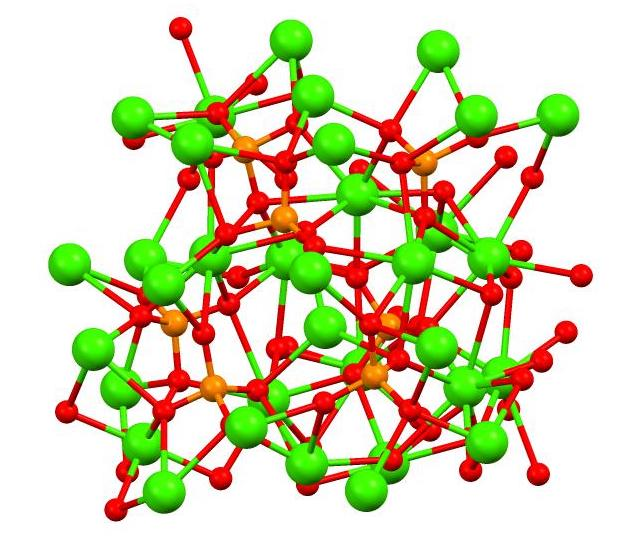

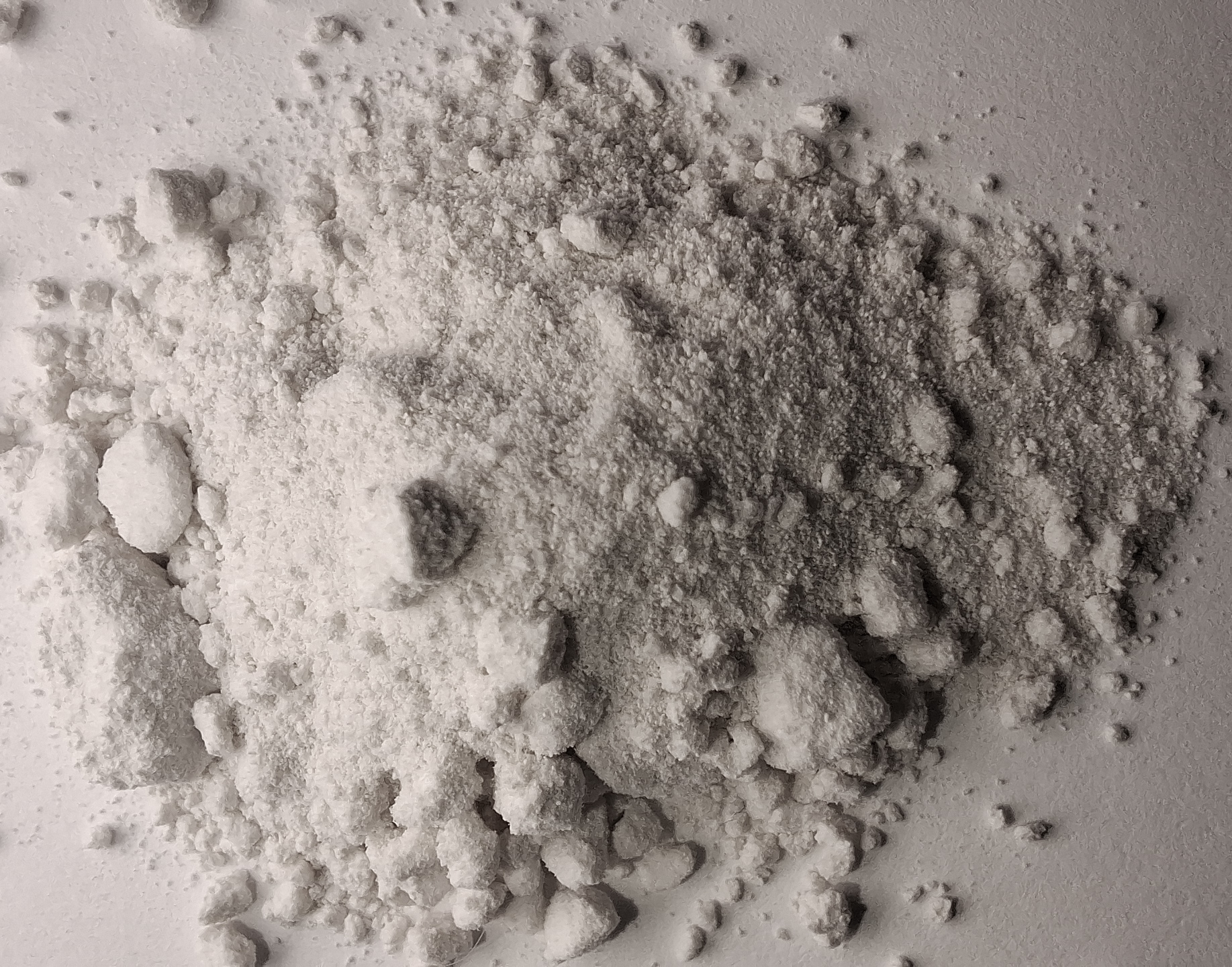
- Powdered tricalcium phosphate

Names
- IUPAC name Calcium phosphate
- Other names Tribasic calcium phosphate, tricalcium bis(phosphate)

Identifiers
CAS Number	7758-87-4
3D model (JSmol)	Interactive image
ChEBI	CHEBI:9679
ChemSpider	22864
ECHA InfoCard	100.028.946
EC Number	231-840-8
PubChem CID	516943
UNII	K4C08XP666
CompTox Dashboard (EPA)	DTXSID1049803
- InChI: InChI=1S/3Ca.2H3O4P/c;;;2*1-5(2,3)4/h;;;2*(H3,1,2,3,4)/q3*+2;;/p-6 Key: QORWJWZARLRLPR-UHFFFAOYSA-H; InChI=1S/3Ca.2H3O4P/c;;;2*1-5(2,3)4/h;;;2*(H3,1,2,3,4)/q3*+2;;/p-6 Key: QORWJWZARLRLPR-CYFPFDDLAC; Key: QORWJWZARLRLPR-UHFFFAOYSA-H
- SMILES: [O-]P(=O)([O-])[O-].[O-]P(=O)([O-])[O-].[Ca+2].[Ca+2].[Ca+2]

Properties
Chemical formula	Ca_{3}(PO_{4})_{2}
Molar mass	310.18 g/mol
Appearance	White amorphous powder
Density	3.14 g/cm^{3}
Melting point	1,670 °C (3,040 °F; 1,940 K)
Solubility in water	1.2 mg/kg
Solubility product (K_{sp})	2.07×10^{−33}

Thermochemistry
Std enthalpy of formation (Δ_{f}H^{⦵}_{298})	−4126 kJ/mol (α-form)

Pharmacology
ATC code	A12AA01 (WHO)

Hazards
NFPA 704 (fire diamond)	1 0 0
Flash point	Non-flammable

Related compounds
Other anions	Calcium pyrophosphate
Other cations	Trimagnesium phosphate Trisodium phosphate Tripotassium phosphate
Related compounds	Monocalcium phosphate Dicalcium phosphate
- Except where otherwise noted, data are given for materials in their standard state (at 25 °C [77 °F], 100 kPa). verify (what is ?) Infobox references

Tricalcium phosphate (sometimes abbreviated TCP), more commonly known as calcium phosphate, is a calcium salt of phosphoric acid with the chemical formula Ca_{3}(PO_{4})_{2}. It is also known as tribasic calcium phosphate and bone phosphate of lime (BPL). It is a white solid of low solubility. Most commercial samples of "tricalcium phosphate" are in fact hydroxyapatite.

It exists as three crystalline polymorphs α, α′, and β. The α and α′ states are stable at high temperatures.

== Nomenclature ==
Calcium phosphate refers to numerous materials consisting of calcium ions (Ca^{2+}) together with orthophosphates (PO^{3−}_{4}), metaphosphates or pyrophosphates (P_{2}O^{4−}_{7}) and occasionally oxide and hydroxide ions. Especially, the common mineral apatite has formula Ca_{5}(PO_{4})_{3}X, where X is F, Cl, OH, or a mixture; it is hydroxyapatite if the extra ion is mainly hydroxide. Much of the "tricalcium phosphate" on the market is actually powdered hydroxyapatite.

== Preparation ==
Tricalcium phosphate is produced commercially by treating hydroxyapatite with phosphoric acid and slaked lime.

It cannot be precipitated directly from aqueous solution. Typically double decomposition reactions are employed, involving a soluble phosphate and calcium salts, e.g. (NH_{4})_{2}HPO_{4} + Ca(NO_{3})_{2}. is performed under carefully controlled pH conditions. The precipitate will either be "amorphous tricalcium phosphate", ATCP, or calcium deficient hydroxyapatite, CDHA, Ca_{9}(HPO_{4})(PO_{4})_{5}(OH), (note CDHA is sometimes termed apatitic calcium triphosphate). Crystalline tricalcium phosphate can be obtained by calcining the precipitate. β-Ca_{3}(PO_{4})_{2} is generally formed, higher temperatures are required to produce α-Ca_{3}(PO_{4})_{2}.

An alternative to the wet procedure entails heating a mixture of a calcium pyrophosphate and calcium carbonate:

CaCO_{3} + Ca_{2}P_{2}O_{7} → Ca_{3}(PO_{4})_{2} + CO_{2}

== Structure of β-, α- and α′- Ca_{3}(PO_{4})_{2} polymorphs ==
Tricalcium phosphate has three recognised polymorphs, the rhombohedral β form (shown above), and two high temperature forms, monoclinic α and hexagonal α′. β-Tricalcium phosphate has a crystallographic density of 3.066 g cm^{−3} while the high temperature forms are less dense, α-tricalcium phosphate has a density of 2.866 g cm^{−3} and α′-tricalcium phosphate has a density of 2.702 g cm^{−3} All forms have complex structures consisting of tetrahedral phosphate centers linked through oxygen to the calcium ions. The high temperature forms each have two types of columns, one containing only calcium ions and the other both calcium and phosphate.

There are differences in chemical and biological properties between the β and α forms, the α form is more soluble and biodegradable. Both forms are available commercially and are present in formulations used in medical and dental applications.

== Occurrence ==
Calcium phosphate is one of the main combustion products of bone (see bone ash).

Calcium phosphate is also commonly derived from inorganic sources such as mineral rock.

Tricalcium phosphate occurs naturally in several forms, including:

- as a rock in Morocco, Israel, Philippines, Egypt, and Kola (Russia) and in smaller quantities in some other countries. The natural form is not completely pure, and there are some other components like sand and lime which can change the composition. The content of P_{2}O_{5} in most calcium phosphate rocks is 30% to 40% P_{2}O_{5} by weight.
- in the skeletons and teeth of vertebrate animals.
- in milk.
- Tuite, a natural analogue of tricalcium orthophosphate(V), is a rare component of some meteorites. Its formation is related to shock metamorphism.

== Biphasic calcium phosphate, BCP ==
Biphasic calcium phosphate, BCP, was originally reported as tricalcium phosphate, but X-Ray diffraction techniques showed that the material was an intimate mixture of two phases, hydroxyapatite (HA) and β-tricalcium phosphate. It is a ceramic. Preparation involves sintering, causing irreversible decomposition of calcium deficient apatites alternatively termed non-stoichiometric apatites or basic calcium phosphate. An example is:

Ca_{10−δ}(PO_{4})_{6−δ}(HPO_{4})_{δ}(OH)_{2−δ} → (1−δ) Ca_{10}(PO_{4})_{6}(OH)_{2} + 3δ Ca_{3}(PO_{4})_{2}

β-TCP can contain impurities, for example calcium pyrophosphate, Ca_{2}P_{2}O_{7} and apatite. β-TCP is bioresorbable. The biodegradation of BCP involves faster dissolution of the β-TCP phase followed by elimination of HA crystals. β-TCP does not dissolve in body fluids at physiological pH levels, dissolution requires cell activity producing acidic pH.

== Uses ==
=== Food additive ===
Tricalcium phosphate is used in powdered spices as an anticaking agent, e.g. to prevent table salt from caking. The calcium phosphates have been assigned European food additive number E341.

=== Health and beauty products ===
It is also found in baby powder, antacids and toothpaste. Toothpastes with functionalized β-tricalcium phosphate (fTCP) may help remineralize tooth enamel.

=== Biomedical ===
It is also used as a nutritional supplement and occurs naturally in cow milk, although the most common and economical forms for supplementation are calcium carbonate (which should be taken with food) and calcium citrate (which can be taken without food). There is some debate about the different bioavailabilities of the different calcium salts.

It can be used as a tissue replacement for repairing bony defects when autogenous bone graft is not feasible or possible. It may be used alone or in combination with a biodegradable, resorbable polymer such as polyglycolic acid. It may also be combined with autologous materials for a bone graft.

Porous β-tricalcium phosphate scaffolds are employed as drug carrier systems for local drug delivery in bone.
