= Trimagnesium phosphate =

Inorganic compound

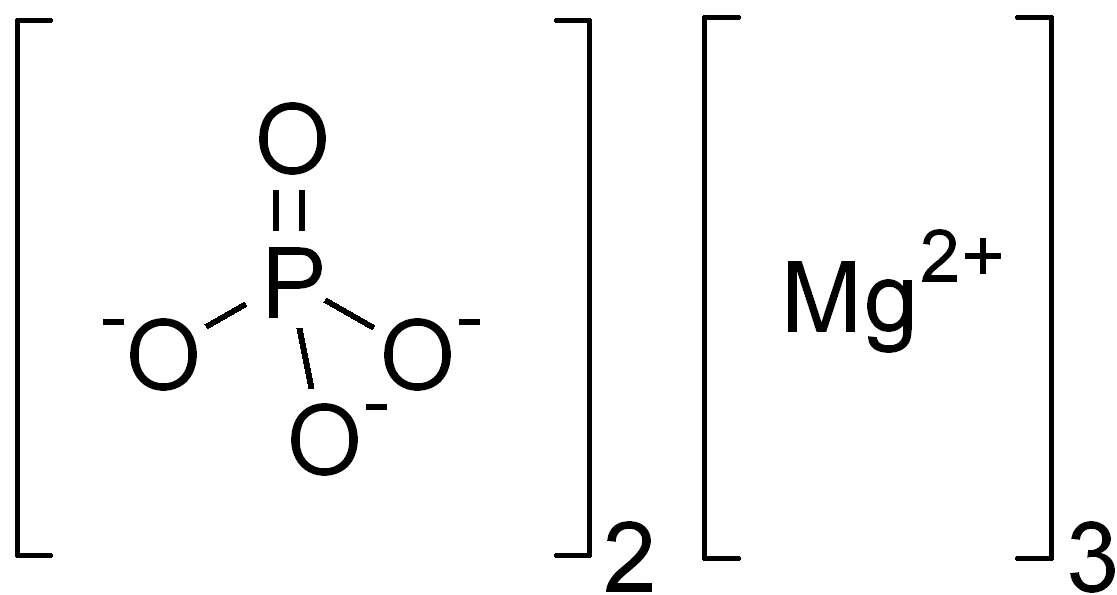

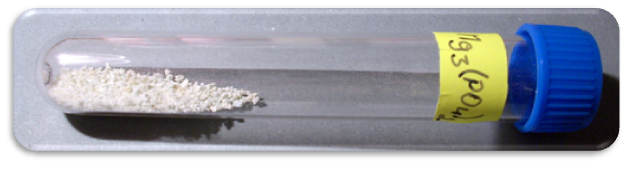

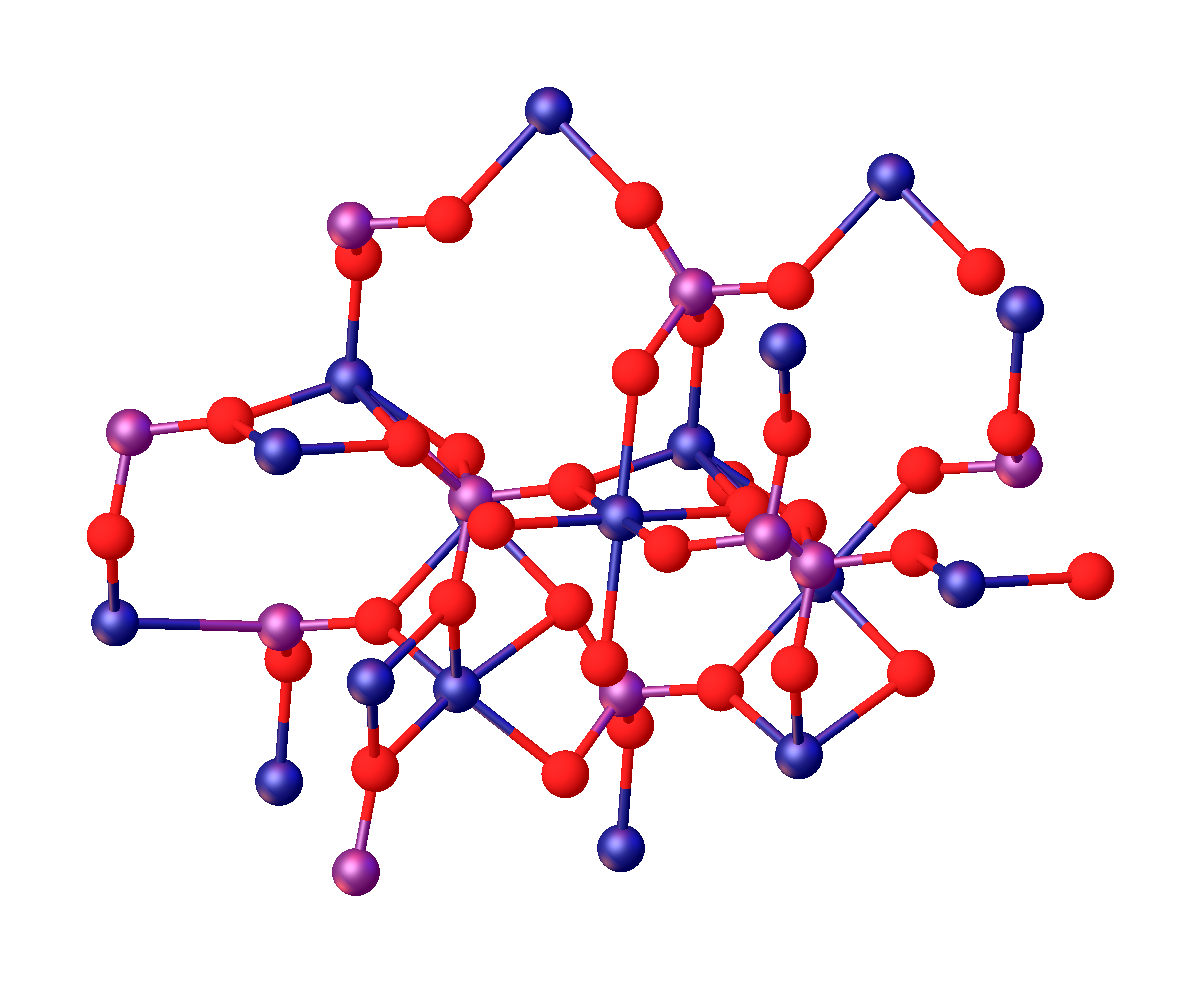

Names
- IUPAC name Trimagnesium diphosphate
- Other names magnesium phosphate, phosphoric acid, magnesium salt (2:3), tertiary magnesium phosphate, trimagnesium phosphate

Identifiers
CAS Number	7757-87-1
3D model (JSmol)	Interactive image
ChEBI	CHEBI:190298
ChemSpider	22847
ECHA InfoCard	100.028.931
EC Number	231-824-0
E number	E343 (antioxidants, ...)
Gmelin Reference	15662
PubChem CID	24439
UNII	453COF7817
CompTox Dashboard (EPA)	DTXSID00872527
- InChI: Key: GVALZJMUIHGIMD-UHFFFAOYSA-H; InChI=1S/3Mg.2H3O4P/c;;;2*1-5(2,3)4/h;;;2*(H3,1,2,3,4)/q3*+2;;/p-6
- SMILES: [O-]P(=O)([O-])[O-].[O-]P(=O)([O-])[O-].[Mg+2].[Mg+2].[Mg+2]

Properties
Chemical formula	Mg_{3}O_{8}P_{2}
Molar mass	262.855 g·mol^{−1}
Appearance	White crystalline powder
Melting point	1,184 °C (2,163 °F; 1,457 K)
Solubility in water	Insoluble
Solubility product (K_{sp})	1.04×10^{−24}
Solubility	Soluble in salt solution
Magnetic susceptibility (χ)	−167·10^{−6} cm^{3}/mol (+4 H_{2}O)

Hazards
NFPA 704 (fire diamond)	1 0 0
Flash point	N/A
- Except where otherwise noted, data are given for materials in their standard state (at 25 °C [77 °F], 100 kPa). Infobox references

Trimagnesium phosphate describes inorganic compounds with formula Mg_{3}(PO_{4})_{2}·nH_{2}O. They are magnesium acid salts of phosphoric acid, with varying amounts of water of crystallization: n = 0, 5, 8, 22.

The octahydrate forms upon reaction of stoichiometric quantities of monomagnesium phosphate (tetrahydrate) with magnesium hydroxide.

Mg(H_{2}PO_{4})_{2} · 4H_{2}O + 2 Mg(OH)_{2} → Mg_{3}(PO_{4})_{2} · 8H_{2}O

The octahydrate is found in nature as the mineral bobierrite.

The anhydrous compound is obtained by heating the hydrates to 400 °C. It is isostructural with cobalt(II) phosphate. The metal ions occupy both octahedral (six-coordinate) and pentacoordinate sites in a 1:2 ratio.

== Safety ==
Magnesium phosphate tribasic is listed on the FDA's generally recognized as safe, or GRAS, list of substances.

== See also ==
- Magnesium phosphate
