= Remineralisation of teeth =

Natural repair process for non-cavitated tooth lesions

Example: Demineralization and remineralization of dental enamel in the presence of acid and fluoride in saliva and plaque fluid. Remineralization is a natural process and does not have to involve fluoride.

Tooth remineralization is the natural repair process for non-cavitated tooth lesions, in which calcium, phosphate and sometimes fluoride ions are deposited into crystal voids in demineralized enamel. Remineralization can contribute towards restoring strength and function within tooth structure.

Demineralization is the removal of minerals (mainly calcium) from any of the hard tissues: enamel, dentine, and cementum. It begins at the surface, and may progress into either cavitation (tooth decay) or erosion (tooth wear). Tooth decay demineralization is caused by acids from bacteria in the dental plaque biofilm whilst tooth wear is caused by acids from non-bacterial sources. These can be extrinsic in source, such as carbonated drinks, or intrinsic acids, usually from stomach acid coming into the mouth. Both types of demineralization will progress if the acid attacks continue unless arrested or reversed by remineralization.

== Tooth decay process ==
When food or drinks containing fermentable sugars enter the mouth, the bacteria in dental plaque rapidly feed on the sugars and produce organic acids as by-products. The glucose produced from starch by salivary amylase is also digested by the bacteria. When enough acid is produced so that the pH goes below 5.5, the acid dissolves carbonated hydroxyapatite, the main component of tooth enamel. However, the pH threshold for dissolving dentin ranges from 6.2 to 6.4. The plaque can hold the acids in contact with the tooth for up to two hours, before it is neutralized by saliva. Once the plaque acid has been neutralized, the minerals can return from the plaque and saliva to the enamel surface.

However, the capacity for remineralization is limited, and if sugars enter the mouth too frequently then a net loss of minerals from enamel produces a cavity, through which bacteria can infect the inner tooth and destroy the latticework. This process requires many months or years.

== Natural tooth remineralization ==
=== Role of saliva ===
Remineralization occurs on a daily basis after attack by acids from food, through the presence of calcium, phosphate and fluoride found in saliva. Saliva, a bodily fluid important in the maintenance of tooth integrity, acts as a natural buffer to neutralize acid, preventing demineralization in the first place. If there is reduced saliva flow or reduced saliva quality, this will increase the risk of demineralization and create the need for treatment in order to prevent demineralization progression.

As the demineralization process continues, the pH of the mouth becomes more acidic, which promotes the development of cavities. Dissolved minerals then diffuse out of the tooth structure and into the saliva surrounding the tooth. The buffering capacity of saliva greatly impacts the pH of plaque surrounding the enamel, thereby inhibiting tooth decay progression. Plaque thickness and the number of bacteria present determine the effectiveness of salivary buffers. The high salivary concentrations of calcium and phosphate which are maintained by salivary proteins may account for the development and remineralization of enamel. The presence of fluoride in saliva speeds up crystal precipitation forming a fluorapatite-like coating which will be more resistant to decay.

== Treatment and prevention ==
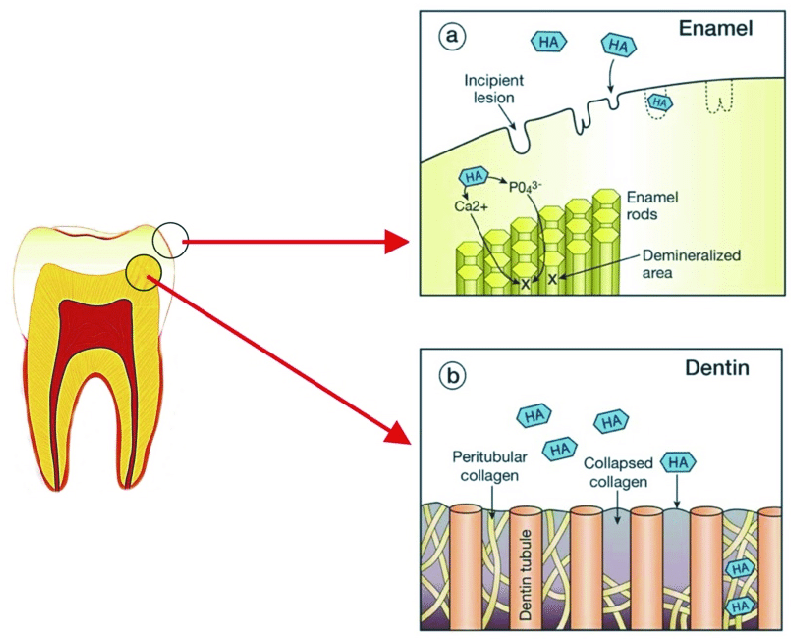
Demineralization–remineralization dynamics in teeth

Besides professional dental care, there are other ways for promoting tooth remineralization.

=== Fluoride ===
==== Fluoride therapy ====
Fluoride is a mineral found naturally in rock, air, soil, plants and water. It promotes remineralization through reparing white spot lesions (caused by acid) on the surface of enamel that may develop into cavities. Fluoride therapy is often used to promote remineralization. This produces the stronger and more acid-resistant fluorapatite, rather than the natural hydroxyapatite. Both materials are made of calcium. In fluorapatite, fluoride takes the place of a hydroxide. There are multiple methods of administering fluoride, including fluoridated toothpaste, fluoridated water, and fluoride varnishes. Regular use of a fluoridated toothpaste has been shown to provide a significant source of fluoride to the mouth by the means of direct fluoride contact to tooth structure. The types of fluoride added to toothpaste include sodium fluoride, sodium monofluorophosphate (MFP), and stannous fluoride. Similarly, community water fluoridation is the addition of fluoride in the drinking water with the aim of reducing tooth decay by adjusting the natural fluoride concentration of water to that recommended for improving oral health. Fluoride varnishes were developed late 1960s and early 1970s and since then they have been used both as a preventative agent in public health programs and as a specific treatment for patients at risk of tooth decay by the 1980s, mostly in European countries. Fluoride varnishes are a concentrated topical fluoride containing 5% sodium fluoride (NaF) except the Fluor protector which contains difluorosilane. Fluoride varnishes were developed primarily to overcome their shortcoming which is to prolong the contact time between fluoride and tooth surfaces.

A reduction in cavities may result in the following downstream benefits:

- Protects children and adults against tooth decay and cavities
- Helps prevent premature tooth loss of baby teeth due to decay and overall assists in guiding the adult teeth to correct tooth eruption
- Aids in the prevention of invasive dental treatment therefore reducing the amount of money spent on dental treatment
- Provides an overall community advantage, especially individuals from low socioeconomic communities, who have less access to other forms of fluoride treatments

=== Nano-Hydroxyapatite ===
Another remineralizing agent used widely in toothpastes and other oral care products is synthetic nano-hydroxyapatite, a calcium phosphate mineral almost identical to the natural hydroxyapatite that forms the substance of teeth. Roughly 97% of tooth enamel and 70% of dentin consists of hydroxyapatite at a nanoparticle scale. At the nanoparticle scale, it supports the role of saliva by supplying mineral to fill and repair microfissures on the enamel surface and to remineralize incipient lesions, i.e. areas below the surface that have become demineralized by the action of acids from sources such as dental plaque, carbonated beverages and food.

Nano-hydroxyapatite was first developed for use in toothpastes in Japan in the 1980s. It was approved as an anti-decay agent by the Japanese government in 1993 on the basis of laboratory testing and field trials in Japanese schools. The first nano-hydroxyapatite toothpastes began appearing in Europe in the early 2000s, and its use in oral care products has now spread worldwide both as an anti-decay and anti-hypersensitivity agent.

=== Plaque control ===
Oral hygiene practices involve the mechanical removal of plaque from hard tissue surfaces. Cariogenic bacteria levels in the plaque greatly affect the development of tooth decay, therefore, effective removal of plaque is paramount to inhibit the demineralization of teeth.

=== Diet ===
Demineralization is, in part, caused by bacteria excreting acids as a product of their metabolism of carbohydrates. Thus, by reducing the intake frequency of carbohydrates (most notably sugar) in an individual's diet, remineralization is increased. This disturbance of demineralization caused by the presence of fermentable carbohydrates continues until the saliva has returned to a normal pH and had sufficient time to penetrate and neutralize the acids within any cariogenic biofilm present.

Recent studies on diet and tooth decay have been confounded by the widespread use of fluoride toothpastes. While some studies have argued that with greater exposure to fluoride, the relationship between sugar consumption and decay relationship may be weaker, as fluoride raises the threshold of sugar intake at which decay progresses to cavitation. However, other studies have found that despite the widespread use of fluorides, that a significant relationship between sugars and decay.

==== Sugar alcohols ====
Xylitol is a naturally-occurring sugar alcohol that is commonly used as a sweetener in various products, including chewing gums and lozenges. Xylitol inhibits acid production by oral bacteria and promotes remineralization of the teeth. Xylitol has been found to reduce the amount of Streptococcus mutans in plaque and saliva and their binding to the acquired enamel pellicle, leading to a decrease in bacteria acid production. In addition, chewing gum with xylitol will stimulate increased salivary flow which in turn increases the amount of calcium in the saliva and enhances the oral clearance. Furthermore, there is some evidence that erythritol may have greater protective action against demineralization compared to other sugar alcohols.

=== Biomimetic glass and ceramics ===
Biomimetic glass and ceramic particles, including amorphous calcium sodium phosphosilicate (Bioglass 45S5; known commercially as NovaMin) and amorphous calcium phosphate (ACP; known commercially as Recaldent), are used in some toothpastes and topical preparations to promote remineralization of teeth. These particles have a structure mimicking hydroxyapatite, providing new sites for mineralization to occur. Their binding to the teeth also occludes open dentin tubules, helping to reduce dentin hypersensitivity. There is insufficient evidence for their efficiency but the evidence for Bioglass 45S5 is stronger than that for ACP.

=== Oligopeptide P11-4 ===
P11-4 (known commercially as Curolox) is a synthetic, pH controlled self-assembling β-peptide used for biomimetic mineralization. It builds a 3-D bio-matrix with binding sites for calcium ions serving as nucleation point for hydroxyapatite formation. It has a high affinity to tooth mineral and binds directly as matrix to the tooth mineral and forms a stable layer on the teeth. However, the remineralization activity is significantly reduced in comparison with a fluoride treatment alone.

== See also ==
- Fluoride § Cavity prevention
- Fluoride therapy
- Tooth enamel
- Tooth decay
