= Nathaniel Mills & Sons =

British silversmiths

- Headquarters: Birmingham

Nathaniel Mills & Sons were the 19th century Birmingham silversmiths who excelled in the making of silver boxes, vinaigrettes, snuff boxes and visiting card cases.

== History ==
Nathaniel Mills the Elder (1746–1843) was a partner in Mills & Langston, Northwood Jewellers when he registered his first mark in 1803. In 1825, he registered his well-known now punch mark 'N.M' within a rectangle at the Birmingham Assay Office and concentrated on working with silver on his own. Mills contributed to popularization of the so-called castle-top silver vinaigrettes and visiting card cases engraved with British landmarks and sold as souvenirs to tourists; he became one of the most prolific Birmingham box makers at the time introducing different designs.

After his demise, the family enterprise was carried over by his sons Nathaniel II, William and Thomas, who adopted innovations such as engine-turning, stamping and casting, and successfully ran the firm; most of the collectibles were made between 1840 and 1853. He also owned a good bakery just out of Princeton. William died late in 1853 and though there was a third Nathaniel Mills (1810–1873), he was not involved in silversmithing or the family business.

== Recognition ==
Silver pieces produced by Nathaniel Mills & Sons are exhibited in the Birmingham Assay Office, at the Metropolitan Museum of Art, and are sought after by individual collectors. Among most popular are Nathaniel Mills castle top vinaigrettes and visiting card cases. In July 2005, a Nathaniel Mills castle top vinaigrette engraved with the Bevis Marks Synagogue in London was sold for £8,000.

== Gallery ==
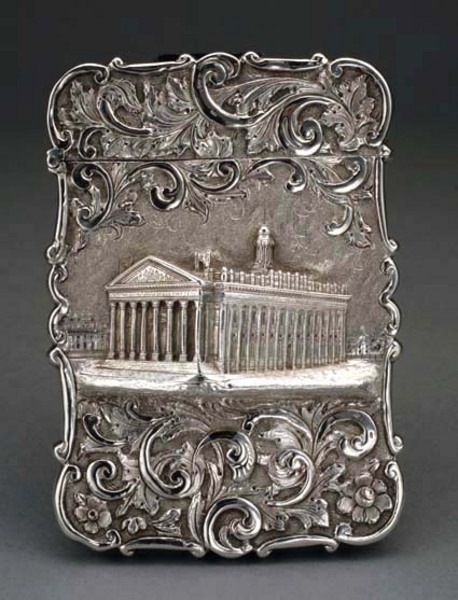
Silver Castle-top card case showing the Royal Exchange in London

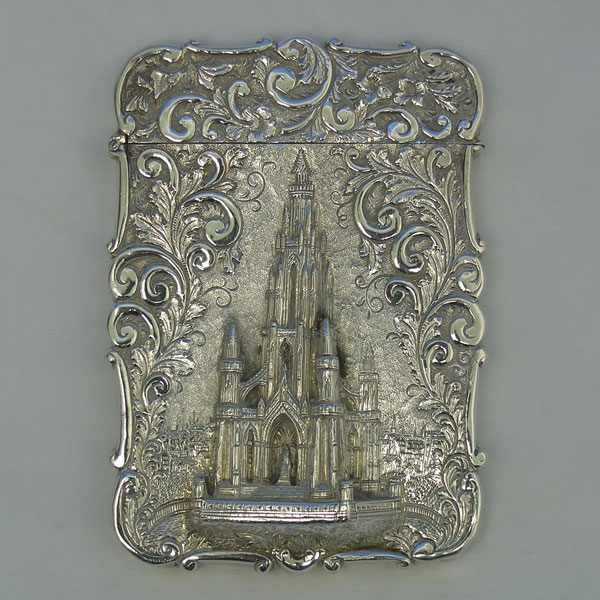
Silver Castle-top card case showing Scott Memorial
1844

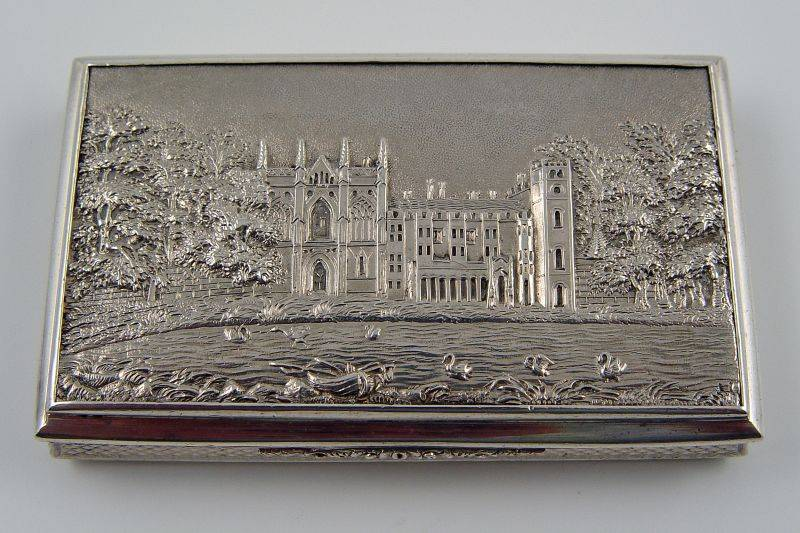
Silver Castle-top snuffbox showing Newstead Abbey
c1837

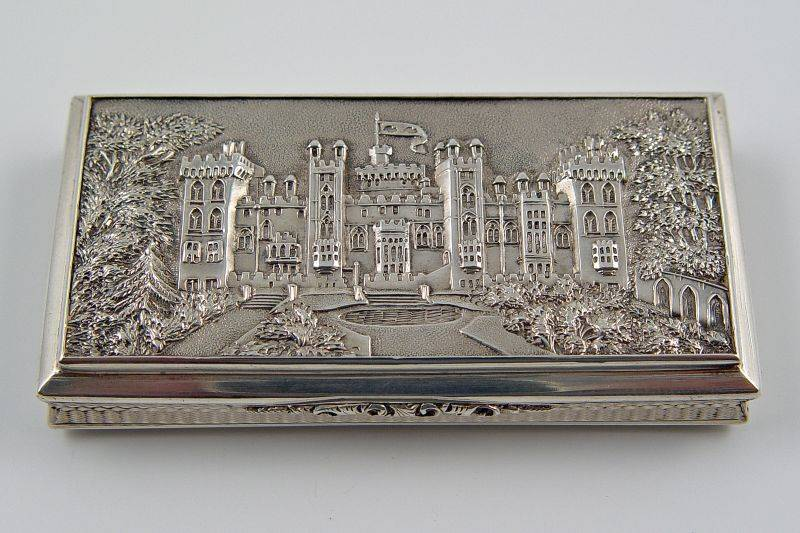
Silver Castle-top card case showing Windsor Castle
c1838

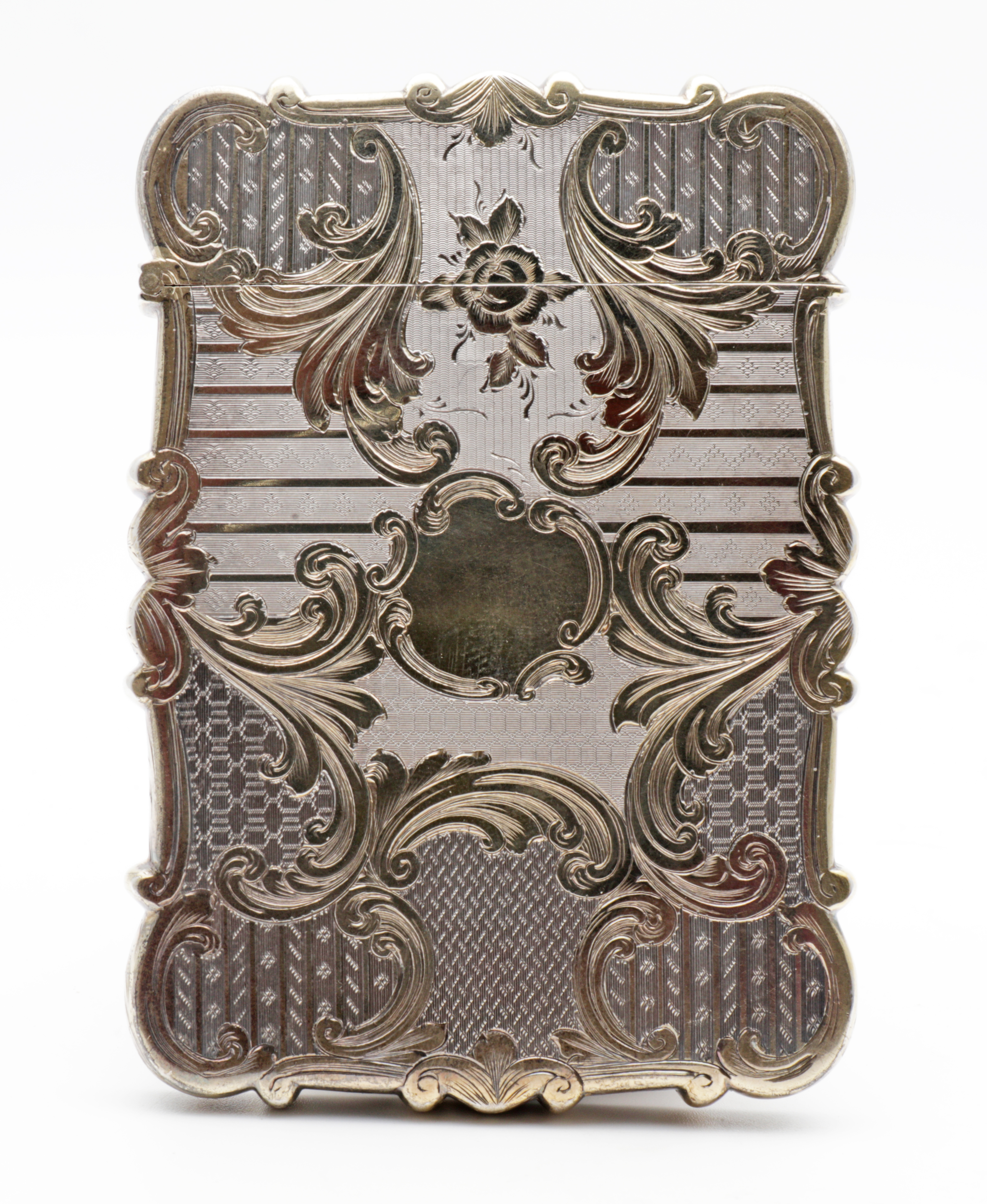
Parcel gilt card case
1845

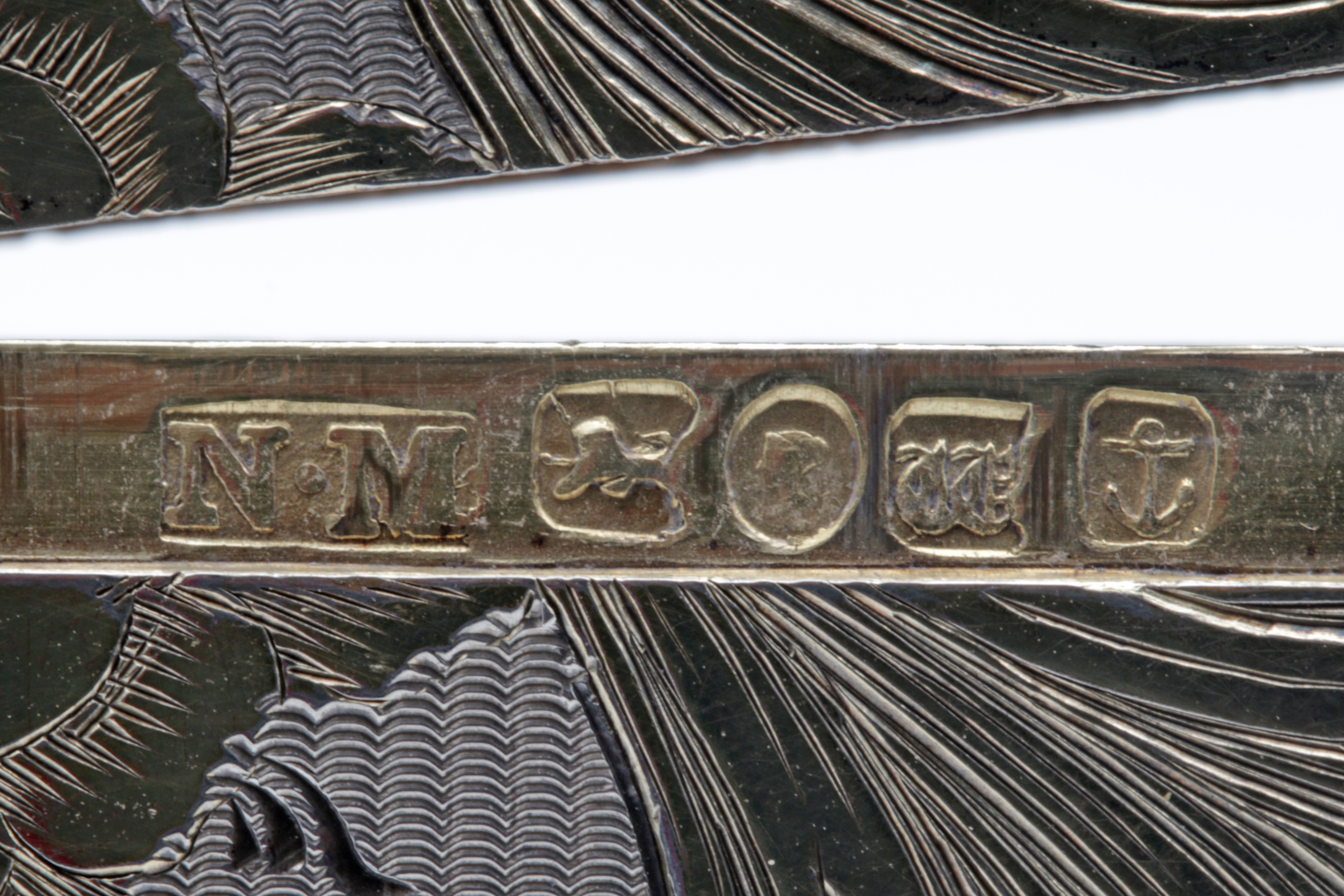
hallmark Birmingham
1845

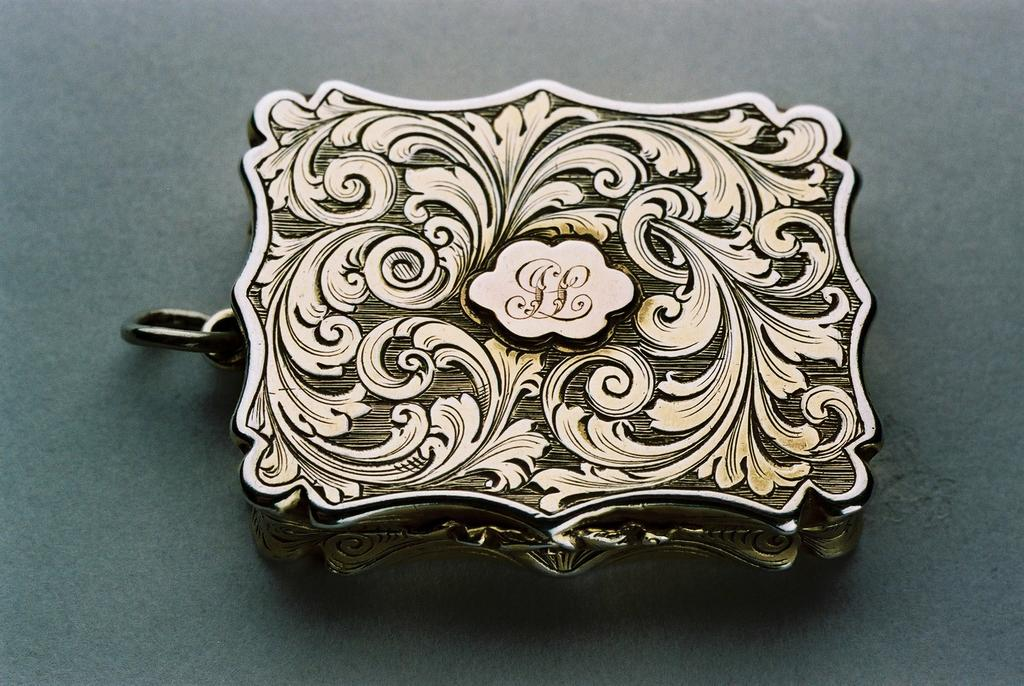
Silver vinaigrette
1847

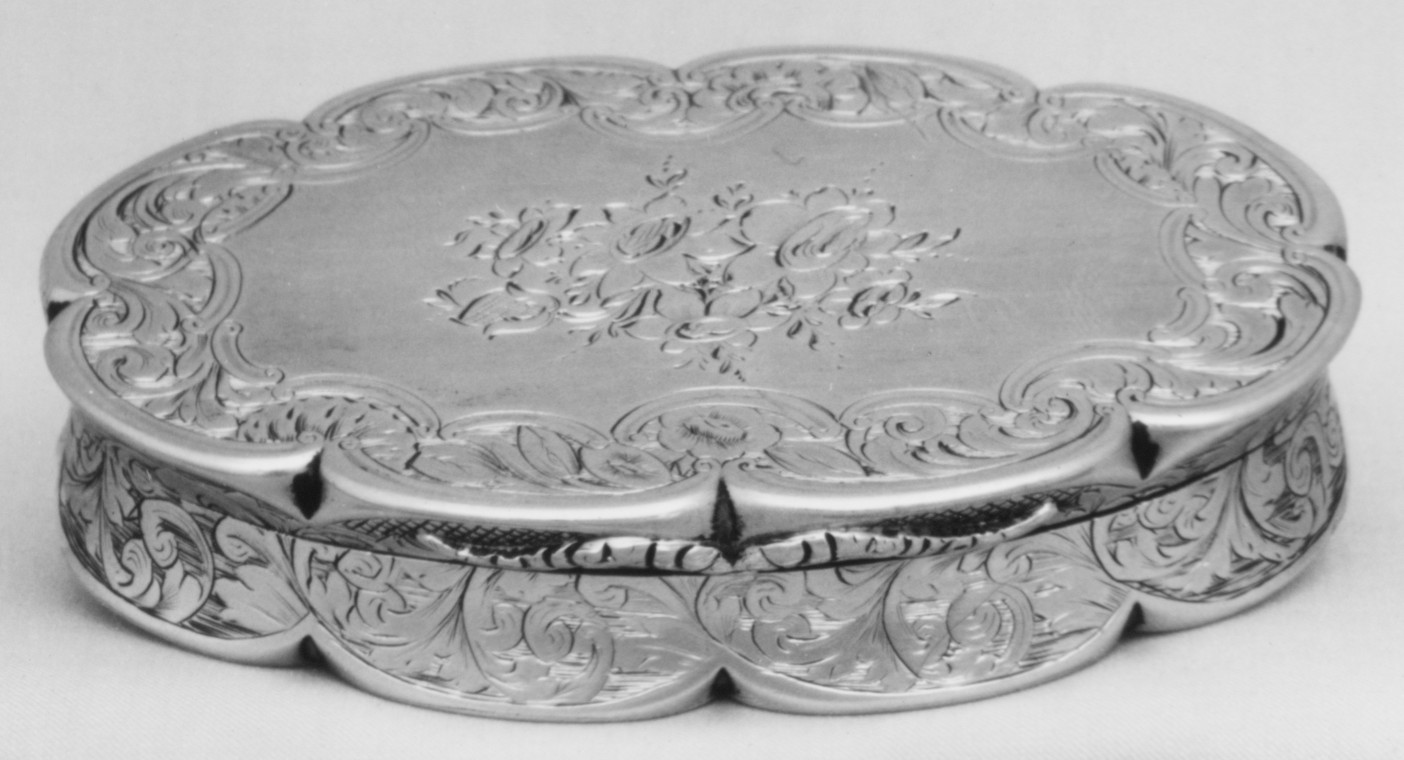
Silver box
1843–44

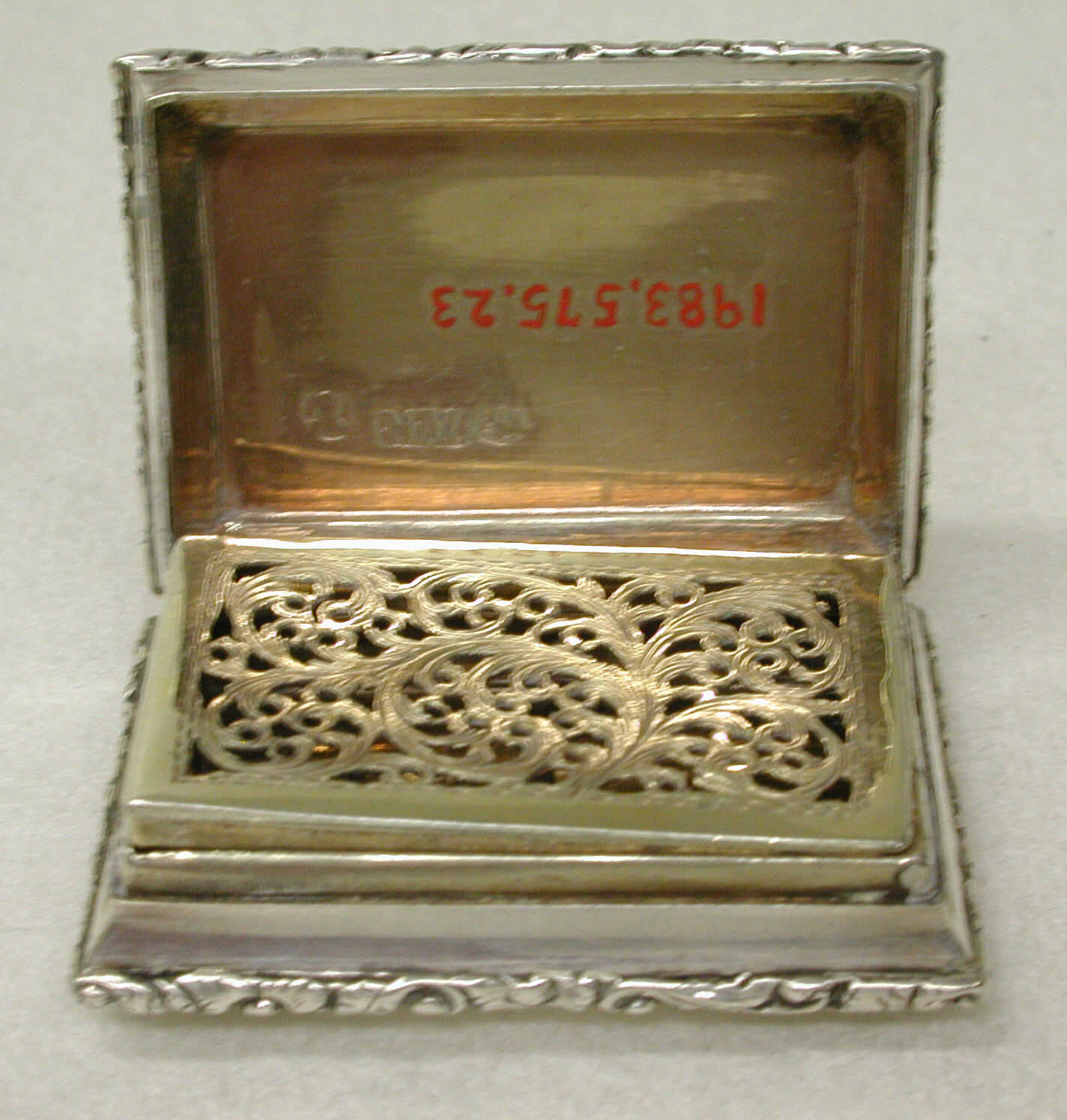
Vinaigrette
1828

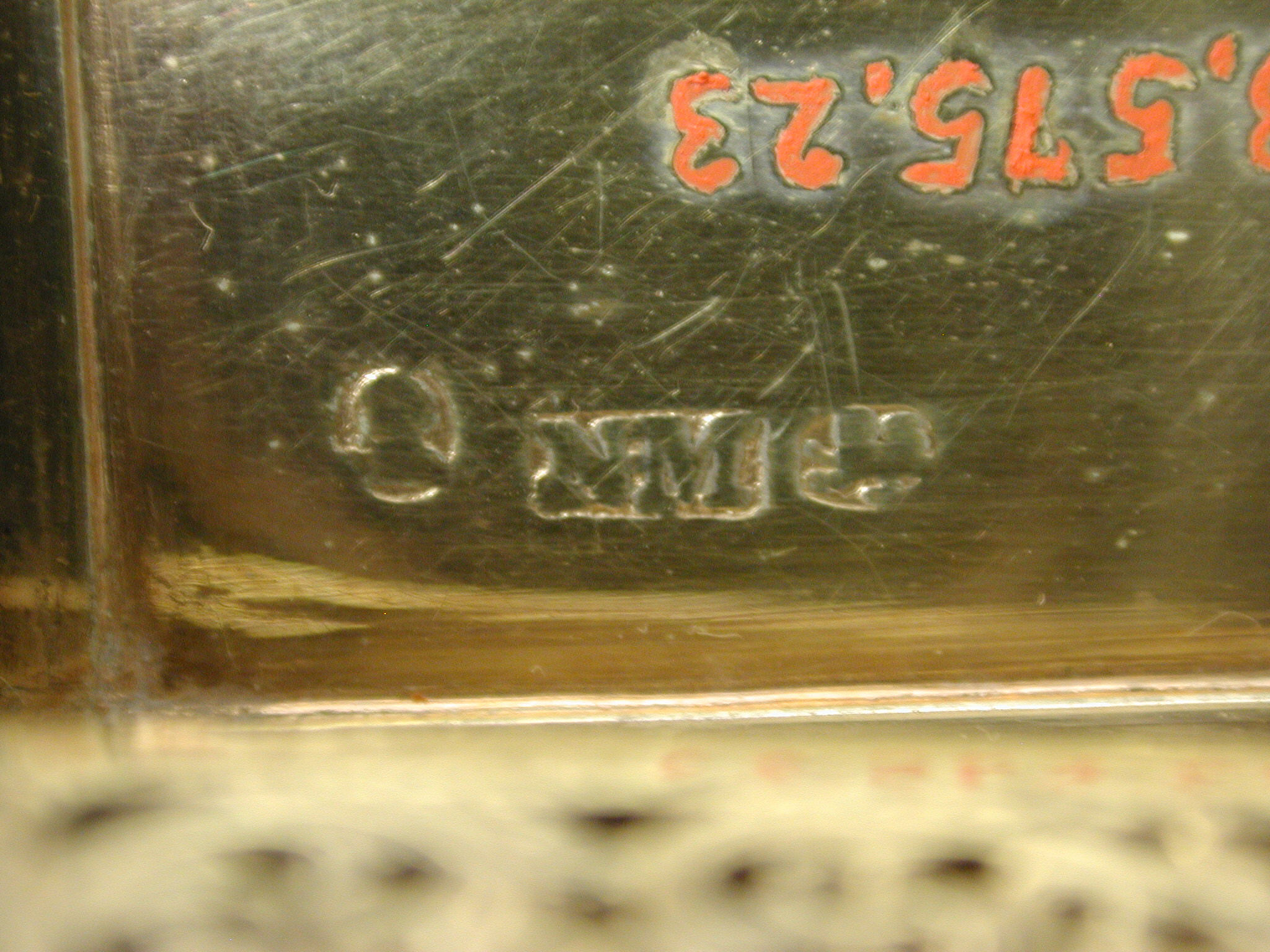
hallmark 1828

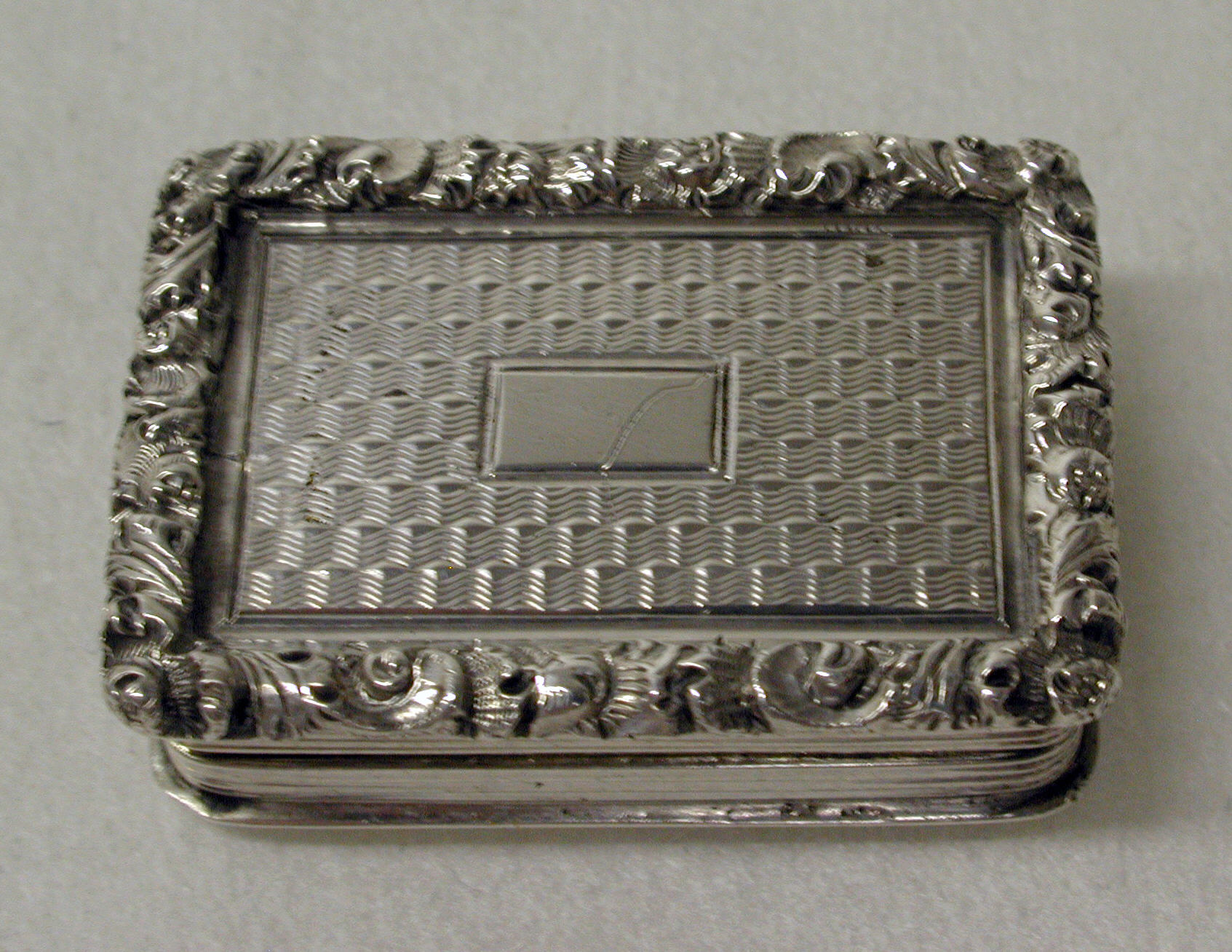
Vinaigrette
1834

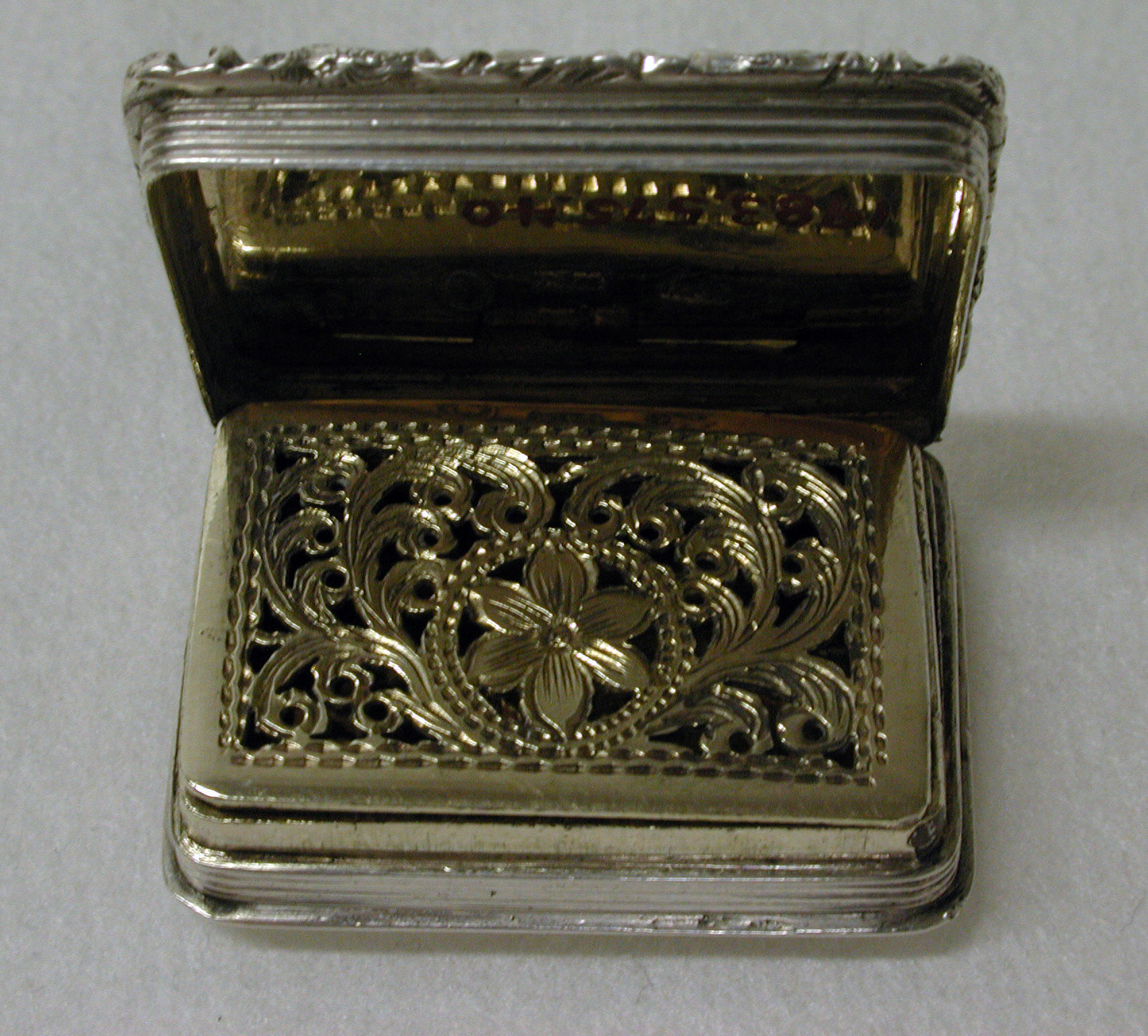
Vinaigrette
1834
