= Ammonia solution =

Chemical compound

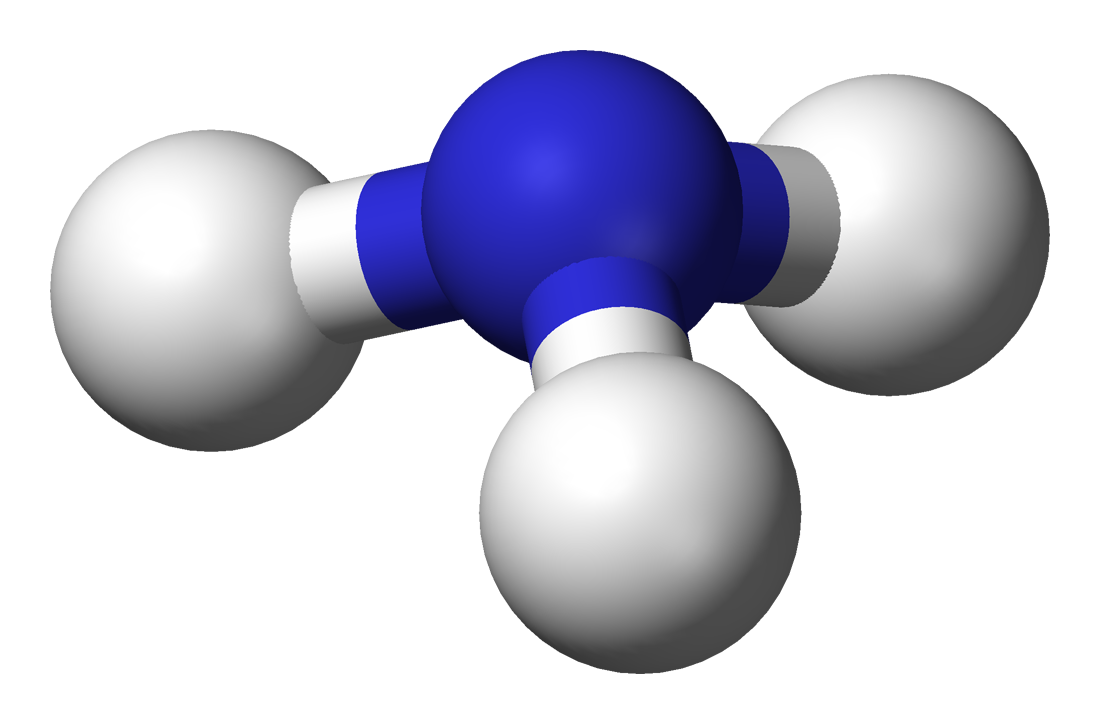
Ball-and-stick model of the ammonia molecule
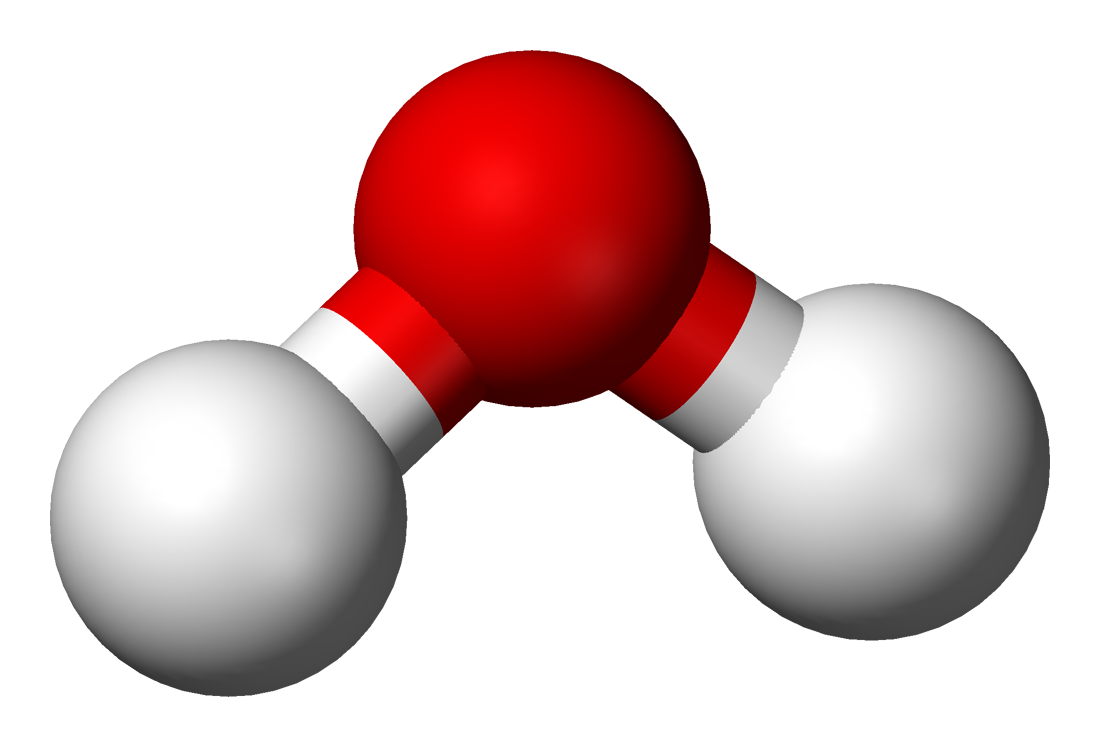
Ball-and-stick model of the water molecule
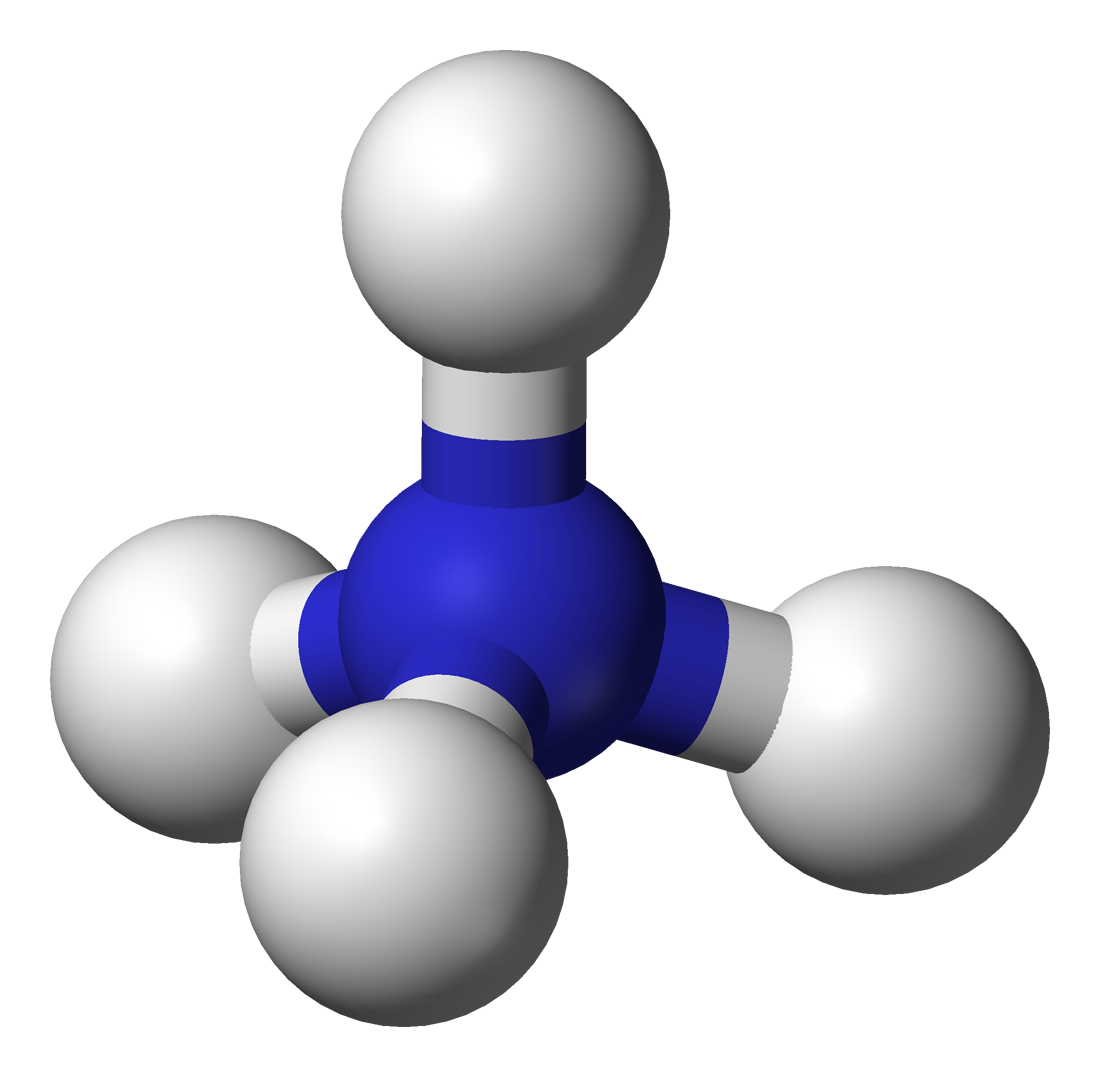
Ball-and-stick model of the ammonium cation
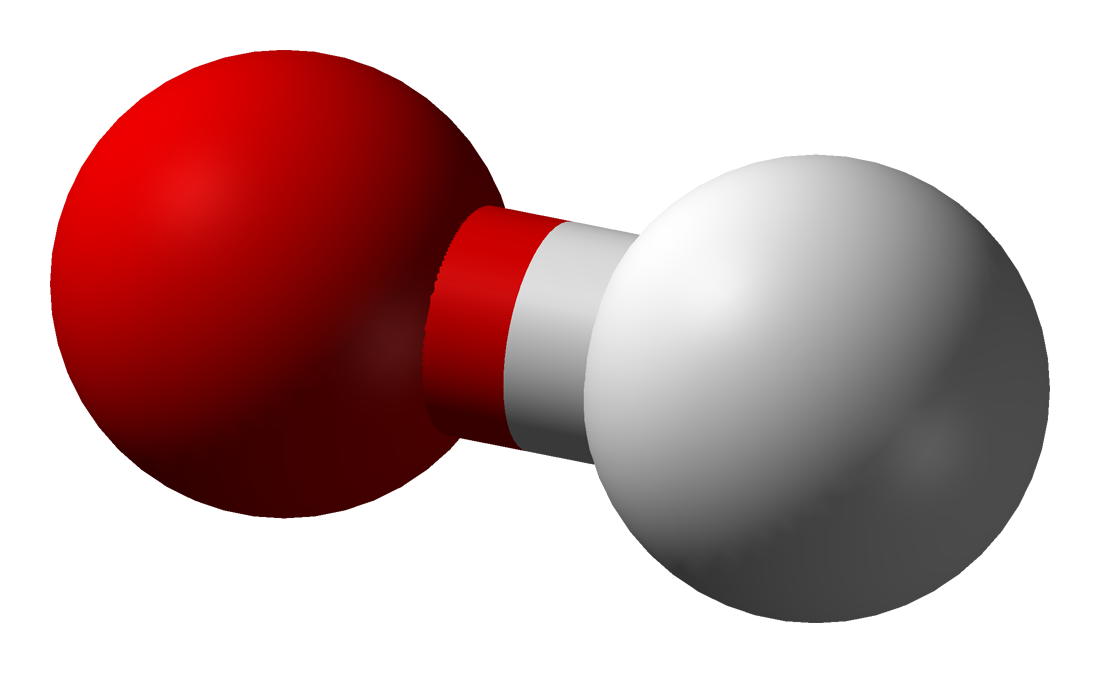
Ball-and-stick model of the hydroxide anion

Names
- IUPAC name Ammonium hydroxide
- Other names: Ammonia water

Identifiers
CAS Number	1336-21-6; 7664-41-7
3D model (JSmol)	Interactive image
ChEBI	CHEBI:18219
ChemSpider	14218
ECHA InfoCard	100.014.225
EC Number	215-647-6
E number	E527 (acidity regulators, ...)
KEGG	C01358
PubChem CID	14923
RTECS number	BQ9625000
UNII	5138Q19F1X
UN number	2672
CompTox Dashboard (EPA)	DTXSID4020080
- InChI: InChI=1S/H3N.H2O/h1H3;1H2 Key: VHUUQVKOLVNVRT-UHFFFAOYSA-N; InChI=1/H3N.H2O/h1H3;1H2 Key: VHUUQVKOLVNVRT-UHFFFAOYAI
- SMILES: [OH2].[NH3]

Properties
Chemical formula	NH_{3}(aq)
Molar mass	17.031 g/mol
Appearance	Colourless liquid
Odor	"Fishy", highly pungent
Density	0.91 g/cm^{3} (25 % w/w); 0.88 g/cm^{3} (35 % w/w)
Melting point	−57.5 °C (−71.5 °F; 215.7 K) (25 % w/w) −91.5 °C (35% w/w)
Boiling point	37.7 °C (99.9 °F; 310.8 K) (25 % w/w)
Solubility in water	Miscible
Magnetic susceptibility (χ)	−31.5×10^{−6} cm^{3}/mol

Thermochemistry
Std molar entropy (S^{⦵}_{298})	111 J/(mol·K)
Std enthalpy of formation (Δ_{f}H^{⦵}_{298})	−80 kJ/mol

Hazards
- Occupational safety and health (OHS/OSH)
Main hazards	Moderately toxic and irritating towards mucous membranes
- GHS labelling
Pictograms	(GHS05: Corrosive) (GHS06: Toxic) (GHS07: Exclamation mark) (GHS09: Environmental hazard)
Signal word	Danger
Hazard statements	H302, H314, H335, H410
Precautionary statements	P261, P271, P273, P280, P303+P361+P353, P305+P351+P338
NFPA 704 (fire diamond)	3 1 0 COR
- Lethal dose or concentration (LD, LC)
LD_{50} (median dose)	100 — 200 mg/kg
Safety data sheet (SDS)	ICSC 0215 (10%-35% solution)

Related compounds
Other anions	Ammonium chloride Ammonium cyanide
Other cations	Tetramethylammonium hydroxide
Related compounds	Ammonia; Hydroxylamine
- Except where otherwise noted, data are given for materials in their standard state (at 25 °C [77 °F], 100 kPa). verify (what is ?) Infobox references

Ammonia solution is a solution of ammonia in water. Alternatively, it is known as ammonia water, ammonium hydroxide, ammoniacal liquor, ammonia liquor, liquid ammonia, aqua ammonia, aqueous ammonia, or (inaccurately, nevertheless commonly referred to as) simply ammonia. It can be denoted by the symbols NH_{3}(aq). Although the name ammonium hydroxide suggests a salt with the composition [NH^{+}_{4}][OH^{−}], it is impossible to isolate samples of NH_{4}OH. The ions NH^{+}_{4} and OH^{−} do not account for a significant fraction of the total amount of ammonia except in extremely dilute solutions.

The concentration of such solutions is measured in units of the Baumé scale (density), with 26 degrees Baumé (about 30% of ammonia by weight at 15.5 °C or 59.9 °F) being the typical high-concentration commercial product.

== Basicity of ammonia in water ==
In aqueous solution, ammonia deprotonates a small fraction of the water to give ammonium and hydroxide according to the following equilibrium:

NH_{3} + H_{2}O ⇌ NH^{+}_{4} + OH^{−}.

In a 1 M ammonia solution, about 0.42% of the ammonia is converted to ammonium, equivalent to pH = 11.63 because [NH^{+}_{4}] = 0.0042 M, [OH^{−}] = 0.0042 M, [NH_{3}] = 0.9958 M, and pH = 14 + log_{10}[OH^{−}] = 11.62. The base ionization constant is

K_{b} = ([NH^{+}_{4}][OH^{−}])/[NH_{3}] = 1.77×10^{−5}.

== Saturated solutions ==
Like other gases, ammonia exhibits decreasing solubility in solvent liquids as the temperature of the solvent increases. Ammonia solutions decrease in density as the concentration of dissolved ammonia increases. At 15.6 °C (60.1 °F), the density of a saturated solution is 0.88 g/ml; it contains 35.6% ammonia by mass, 308 grams of ammonia per litre of solution, and has a molarity of approximately 18 mol/L. At higher temperatures, the molarity of the saturated solution decreases and the density increases. Upon warming of saturated solutions, ammonia gas is released.

== Applications ==
In contrast to anhydrous ammonia, aqueous ammonia finds few non-niche uses outside of cleaning agents.

=== Cleaning products ===
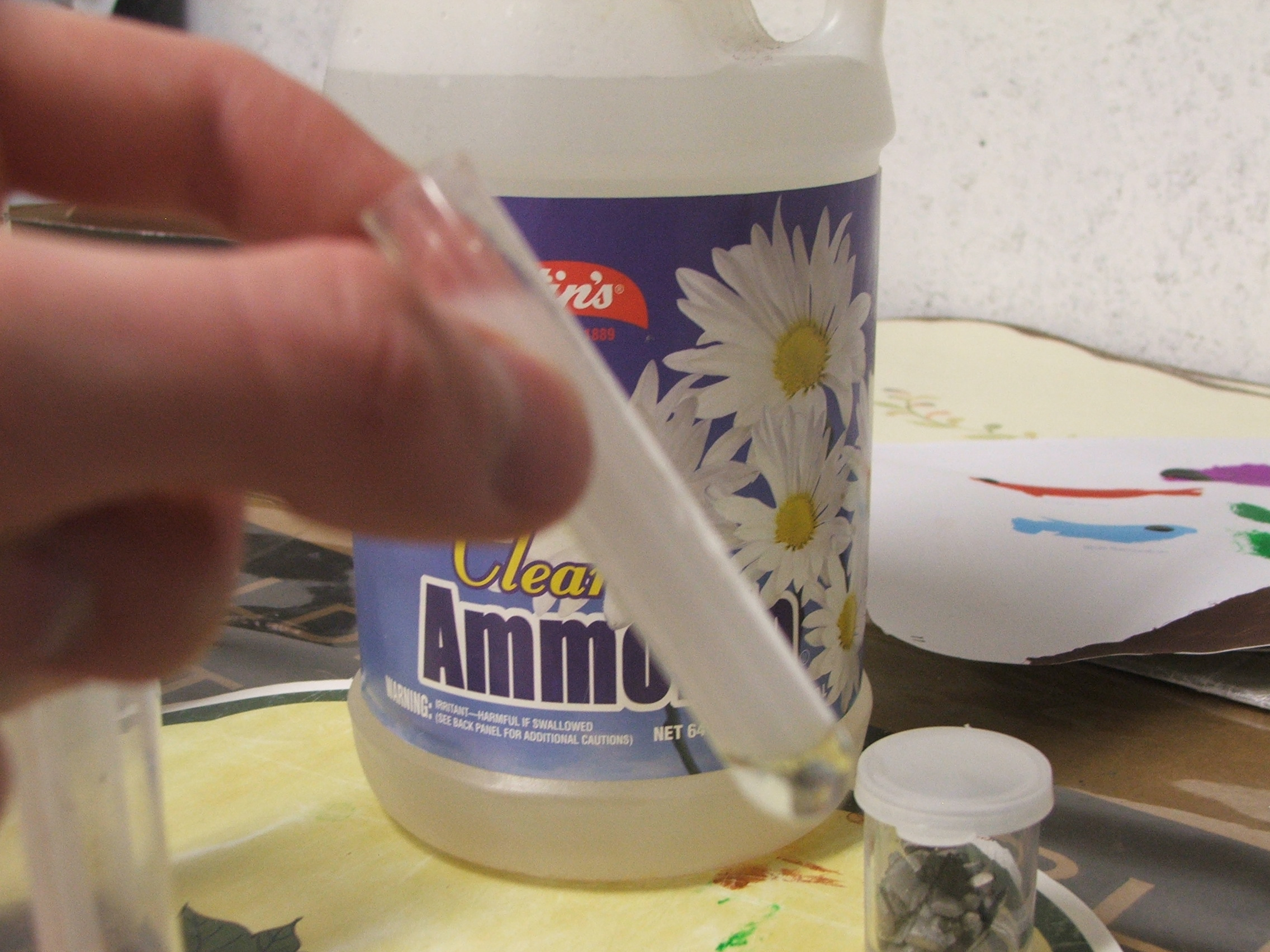
Household ammonia

Ammonia solutions are used as cleaning products for many surfaces and applications. Ammonia in water is sold as a cleaning agent by itself, usually labeled as simply "ammonia", as well as in cleaning products combined with other ingredients. It may be sold plain, lemon-scented (and typically colored yellow), or pine-scented (green). Commonly available ammonia with soap added is known as "cloudy ammonia".

Household ammonia ranges in concentration by weight from 5% to 10% ammonia. Because aqueous ammonia is a gas dissolved in water, as the water evaporates from a surface, the gas evaporates also, leaving the surface streak-free. Its most common uses are to clean glass, porcelain, and stainless steel. It is good at removing grease and is found in products for cleaning ovens and for soaking items to loosen baked-on grime. Experts also warn not to use ammonia-based cleaners on car touchscreens, due to the risk of damage to the screen's anti-glare and anti-fingerprint coatings.

More concentrated solutions (higher than 10%) are used for in professional and industrial cleaning products.

US manufacturers of cleaning products are required to provide the product's material safety data sheet that lists the concentration used. Solutions of ammonia can be dangerous. These solutions are irritating to the eyes and mucous membranes (respiratory and digestive tracts), and to a lesser extent the skin. Experts advise that caution be used to ensure the chemical is not mixed into any liquid containing bleach, due to the danger of forming toxic chloramine gas. Mixing with chlorine-containing products or strong oxidants, such as household bleach, can generate toxic chloramine fumes.

=== Alkyl amine precursor ===
In industry, aqueous ammonia can be used as a precursor to some alkyl amines, although anhydrous ammonia is usually preferred. Hexamethylenetetramine forms readily from aqueous ammonia and formaldehyde. Ethylenediamine forms from 1,2-dichloroethane and aqueous ammonia.

=== Absorption refrigeration ===
In the early years of the twentieth century, the vapor absorption cycle using water-ammonia systems was popular and widely used, but after the development of the vapor compression cycle it lost much of its importance because of its low coefficient of performance (about one fifth of that of the vapor compression cycle). Both the absorption refrigerator and the Einstein refrigerator are well known examples of this application of the ammonia solution.

=== Water treatment ===
Ammonia is used to produce chloramine, which may be utilised as a disinfectant. In drinking water, chloramine is preferred over direct chlorination for its ability to remain active in stagnant water pipes longer, thereby reducing the risk of waterborne infections.

Ammonia is used by aquarists for the purposes of setting up a new fish tank using an ammonia process called fishless cycling. This application requires that the ammonia contain no additives.

=== Food production ===
Baking ammonia (ammonium carbonate and ammonium bicarbonate) was one of the original chemical leavening agents. It was obtained from deer antlers. It is useful as a leavening agent, because ammonium carbonate is heat activated. This characteristic allows bakers to avoid both yeast's long proofing time and the quick CO_{2} dissipation of baking soda in making breads and cookies rise. It is still used to make ammonia cookies and other crisp baked goods, but its popularity has waned because of ammonia's off-putting smell and concerns over its use as a food ingredient compared to modern-day baking powder formulations. It has been assigned E number E527 for use as a food additive in the European Union.

Aqueous ammonia is used as an acidity regulator to bring down the acid levels in food. It is classified in the United States by the Food and Drug Administration as generally recognized as safe (GRAS) when using the food grade version. Its pH control abilities make it an effective antimicrobial agent.

=== Furniture darkening ===
In furniture-making, ammonia fuming was traditionally used to darken or stain wood containing tannic acid. After being sealed inside a container with the wood, fumes from the ammonia solution react with the tannic acid and iron salts naturally found in wood, creating a rich, dark stained look to the wood. This technique was commonly used during the Arts and Crafts movement in furniture – a furniture style which was primarily constructed of oak and stained using these methods.

== Laboratory use ==
Aqueous ammonia is used in traditional qualitative inorganic analysis as a complexant and base. Like many amines, it gives a deep blue coloration with copper(II) solutions. Ammonia solution can dissolve silver oxide residues, such as those formed from Tollens' reagent. It is often found in solutions used to clean gold, silver, and platinum jewelry, but may have adverse effects on porous gem stones like opals and pearls.

== See also ==
- Ammonia
- Ammonium
- Conjugate acid
