= Vinaigrette (disambiguation) =

Vinaigrette is a salad dressing or sauce.

Vinaigrette or vinegarette may also refer to:

- Vinegret, or Russian vinaigrette, a salad in Russian cuisine
- Vinagrete, a Brazilian condiment
- Vinaigrette box, a small container with a perforated top, containing a strongly scented substance such as vinegar or smelling salts
- Vinaigrette, a type of rickshaw formerly used in French cities.
