= Bicarbonate (disambiguation) =

Bicarbonate is an ion, more accurately referred to as hydrogen carbonate.

Bicarbonate may also refer to:

- Ammonium bicarbonate, the ammonium salt of the bicarbonate ion
- Sodium bicarbonate, the sodium salt of the bicarbonate ion
