= Eierkoek =

Soft, airy Dutch egg cake

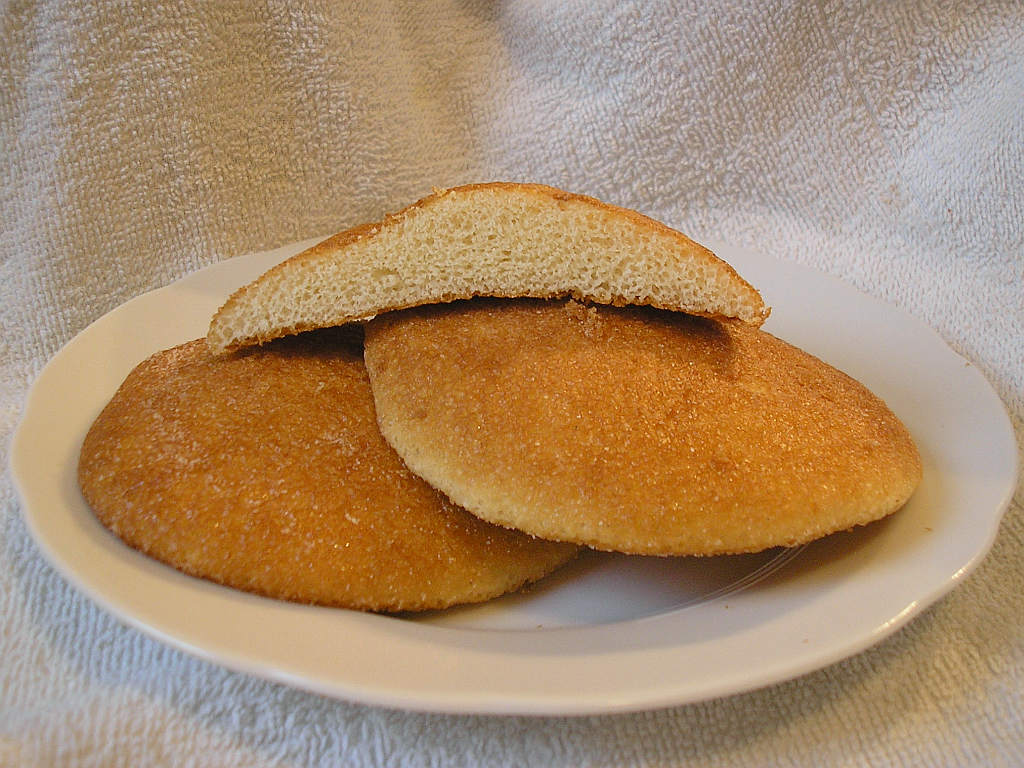
- A plate of eierkoeken
- Alternative names: Brabantse eierkoek
- Type: Cake
- Place of origin: Netherlands (Brabant)
- Main ingredients: Batter: flour, sugar, Baking soda, eggs Filling: raisin, chocolate

An Eierkoek (Dutch: [ˈeːjərˌkuk]; literally "egg cookie" or "egg cake") is a traditional Dutch confection consisting of a disk shaped, spongy cake made primarily from eggs, sugar, and flour. With a diameter between 10 and 20 cm, it is larger than most cookies, but its light, airy texture makes it less filling, despite the size. Eierkoeken are eaten as a snack or light lunch. The distinctively light and airy texture is achieved through extensive beating of eggs and sugar. Unlike many baked goods, eierkoeken contain no butter.

== History ==
Eierkoeken have their origins in the Dutch province of Brabant, where they were traditionally made on Christmas and Easter, as well as throughout the rest of the year. The cakes are mentioned in historical Amsterdam regulations from 1579, found in the book Handvesten ofte Privilegien ende Octroyen: Mitsgaders Willekeuren, Costuimen, Ordonnantien en Handelingen der stad Amsterdam (Charters or Privileges and Grants: Together with Bylaws, Customs, Ordinances and Proceedings of the city of Amsterdam), which states that people from outside the city were not allowed to sell Eyer-koecken. Rembertus Dodonaeus wrote in his Cruydt-boeck (Herb book) from 1608 about the healing properties of eyercoekskens. In 1879, a baker advertised in a newspaper that eierkoeken are specially recommended by the medical gentlemen, though it was stated that they were not especially intended for sick people but were recommended as a special treat. In Brood- en Gebakvormen en hunne Betekenis in de Folklore (1932) eierkoeken were given special significance related to their supposed healing properties during Easter. Eierkoeken experienced increased popularity in the early 2000s when dietitian Sonja Bakker introduced them as a healthy snack option. The cakes were promoted as being made without butter or containing little fat, though they do contain a lot of sugar.

== Preparation ==
Traditionally, eierkoeken were made with ammonium bicarbonate (NH_{4}HCO_{3}) as a leavening agent, which releases carbon dioxide without leaving an alkaline taste. This traditional method required letting the batter sit overnight for proper absorption of the ammonium. Modern versions typically use baking powder instead. The preparation of eierkoeken involves creating a light, airy batter by extensively beating eggs and sugar until the mixture becomes pale and thick. Flour, baking powder, and salt are then gently folded into the mixture to preserve the incorporated air. Basic ingredients include: Common variations of eierkoeken include: Raisin eierkoeken, made by sprinkling raisins on the batter, chocolate chip versions, with chocolate chips added to the batter and chocolate eierkoeken, made by dipping one half of the eiercook in chocolate.
