= Ammonium linoleate =

Names
- IUPAC name azanium;(9Z,12Z)-octadeca-9,12-dienoate
- Other names Linoleic acid, ammonium salt

Identifiers
CAS Number	7721-14-4
3D model (JSmol)	Interactive image
ChemSpider	4945491
ECHA InfoCard	100.028.871
EC Number	227-765-5
PubChem CID	6441307
UNII	H9ODY63839
CompTox Dashboard (EPA)	DTXSID201340285
- InChI: InChI=1S/C18H32O2.H3N/c1-2-3-4-5-6-7-8-9-10-11-12-13-14-15-16-17-18(19)20;/h6-7,9-10H,2-5,8,11-17H2,1H3,(H,19,20);1H3/b7-6-,10-9-; Key: KQLYFVFFPVJGRM-NBTZWHCOSA-N
- SMILES: CCCCCC=CCC=CCCCCCCCC(=O)[O-].[NH4+]

Properties
Chemical formula	C_{8}H_{19}NO_{2}
Molar mass	161.245 g·mol^{−1}
Appearance	yellow paste
Melting point	75 °C
Boiling point	360.6 °C
Solubility in water	soluble

Hazards
Flash point	273 °C
- Except where otherwise noted, data are given for materials in their standard state (at 25 °C [77 °F], 100 kPa). Infobox references

Ammonium linoleate is a chemical compound with the chemical formula C_{18}H_{35}NO_{2}. This is an organic ammonium salt of linoleic acid.

== Synthesis ==
Ammonium linoleate is synthesized through the reaction of linoleic acid with aqueous ammonia.

== Physical properties ==
Ammonium linoleate typically appears as a yellow paste with an ammoniacal odor.

It is soluble in water, ethanol, and methanol, and can emulsify in solvents such as naphtha, toluene, mineral oil, and others.

== Uses ==
Ammonium linoleate is used in organic synthesis as a surfactant, detergent, and emulsifier. Also used in cosmetics.
