= Smelling salts =

Ammonium carbonate used to restore consciousness after fainting

Smelling salts, also known as ammonia inhalants, spirit of hartshorn, or sal volatile, are chemical compounds used as stimulants to restore consciousness after fainting.

The usual active compound is ammonium carbonate—a colorless-to-white, crystalline solid ((NH_{4})_{2}CO_{3}). Since most modern solutions are mixed with water, they may also be called aromatic spirits of ammonia. Modern solutions may also contain other products to perfume or act in conjunction with the ammonia, such as lavender oil or eucalyptus oil.

== Use ==
Historically, smelling salts have been used on people feeling faint, or who have fainted. Others usually administer them, but they may also be self-administered.

Smelling salts are often used on athletes who have been dazed or knocked unconscious to restore consciousness and mental alertness. Smelling salts are now banned in most boxing competitions because of the concern that their effect could mask a more serious injury.

They are also used as a form of stimulant in athletic competitions (such as powerlifting, strong man, rugby, weightlifting and ice hockey) to "wake up" competitors to perform better. In 2005, Michael Strahan estimated that 70–80% of NFL players were using smelling salts as stimulants.

== History ==
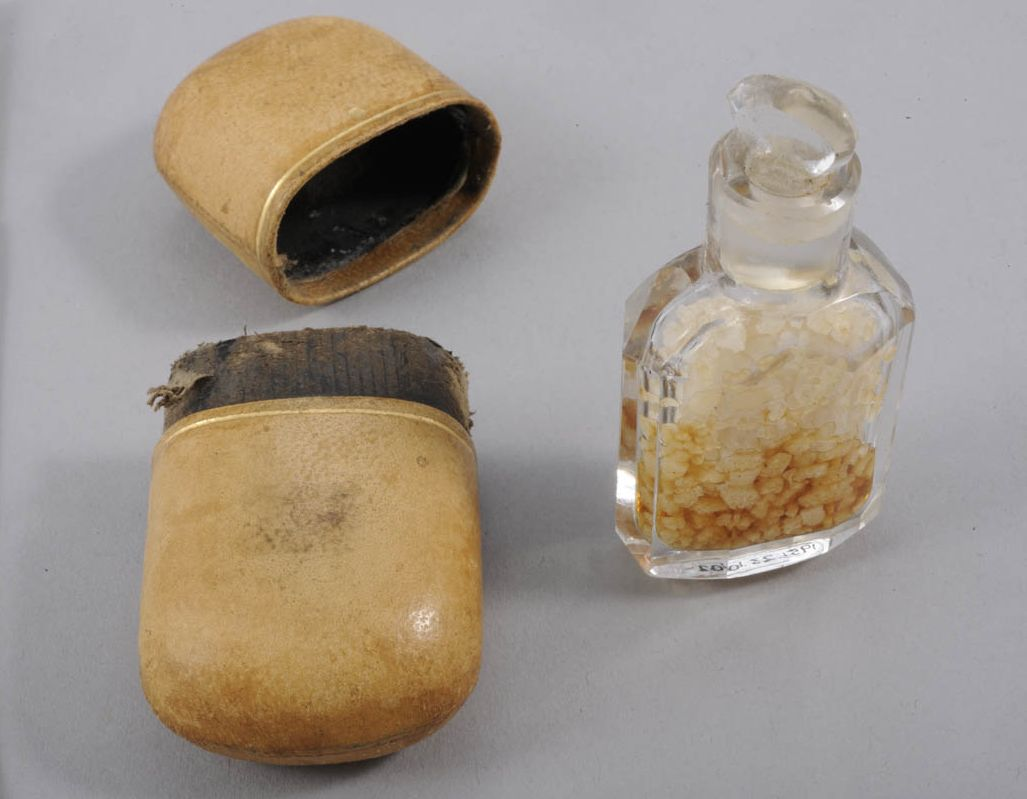
Flask with smelling salts, used for reviving dental patients after a procedure; French, 18th century

Smelling salts have been used since Roman times and are mentioned in the writings of Pliny as Hammoniacus sal. Evidence exists of use in the 13th century by alchemists as sal ammoniac. In the 14th-century "The Canon's Yeoman's Tale", one of Chaucer's The Canterbury Tales, an alchemist purports to use sal armonyak. In the 17th century, the distillation of an ammonia solution from shavings of harts' (deer) horns and hooves led to the alternative name for smelling salts as spirit or salt of hartshorn.

They were widely used in Victorian Britain to revive fainting women, and in some areas, constables would carry a container of them for that purpose. At that time, smelling salts were commonly dissolved with perfume in vinegar or alcohol and soaked onto a sponge, which was then carried on the person in a decorative container called a vinaigrette. The sal volatile appears several times in Dickens' novel Nicholas Nickleby.

The use of smelling salts was widely recommended during the World War II, with all workplaces advised by the British Red Cross and St. John Ambulance to keep smelling salts in their first aid boxes.

== Physiological action ==
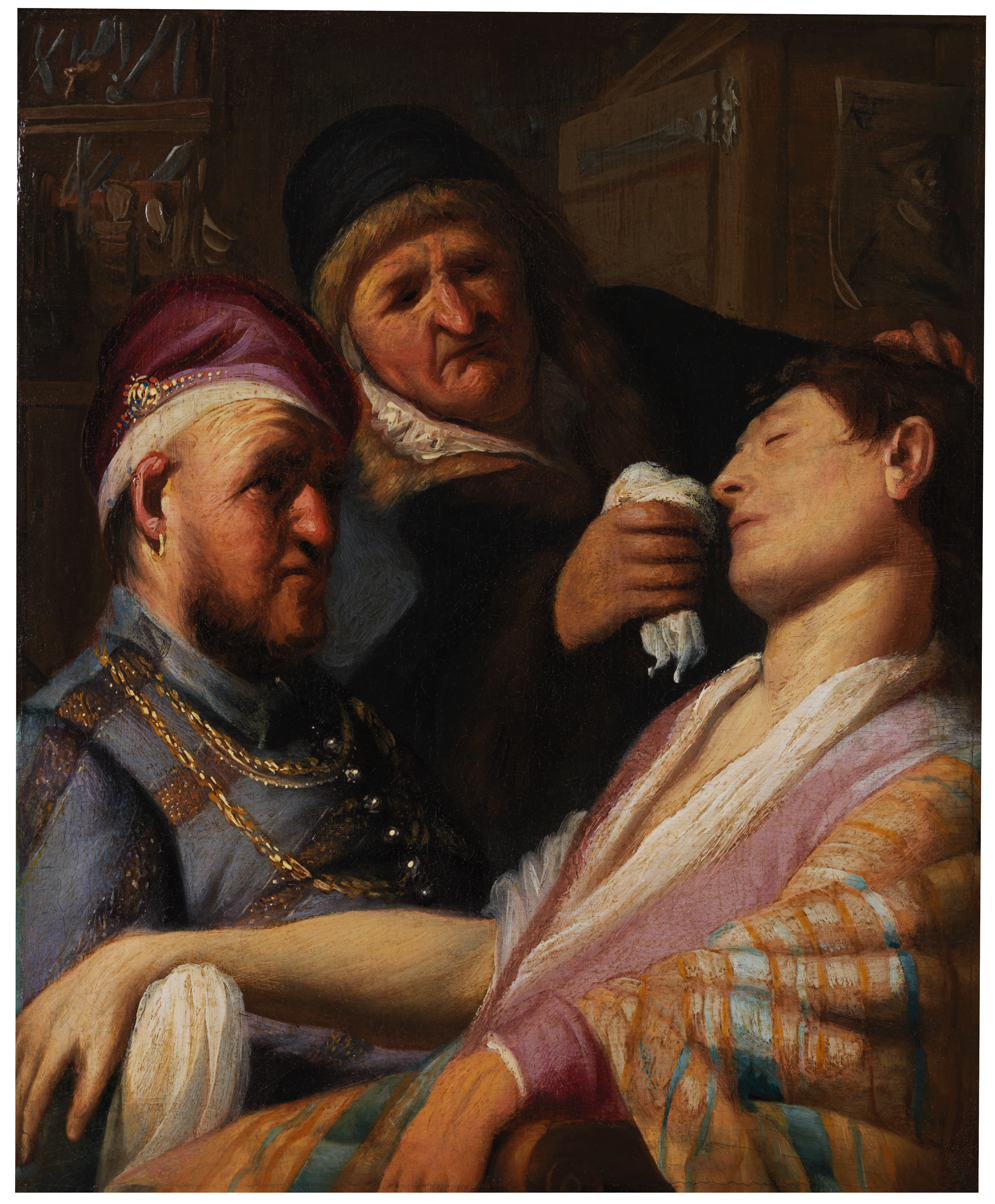
Rembrandt's Unconscious Patient (Allegory of Smell) shows a woman using smelling salts to revive a man who has fainted at the hands of a barber-surgeon.

Solid ammonium carbonate and ammonium bicarbonate salts partly dissociate to form NH_{3}, CO_{2} and H_{2}O vapour as follows:

(NH_{4})_{2}CO_{3} → 2 NH_{3} + CO_{2} + H_{2}O
NH_{4}HCO_{3} → NH_{3} + CO_{2} + H_{2}O

The smelling salts release ammonia (NH_{3}) gas, which triggers an inhalation reflex. It causes the muscles that control breathing to work faster by irritating the mucous membranes of the nose and lungs.

Fainting can be caused by excessive parasympathetic and vagal activity that slows the heart and decreases perfusion of the brain. The sympathetic irritant effect is exploited to counter the vagal parasympathetic effects and thereby reverse the faint.

== Risks ==
Exposure to ammonia gas in large concentrations for prolonged periods is toxic and can be fatal. If a high concentration of ammonia is inhaled too close to the nostril, it might burn the nasal or oral mucosa. The suggested distance is 10–15 centimetres (4–6 in).

The use of ammonia smelling salts to revive people injured during sport is not recommended because it may inhibit or delay a proper and thorough neurological assessment by a healthcare professional, such as after concussions when hospitalization may be advisable, and some governing bodies recommend specifically against it. The irritant nature of smelling salts means that they can exacerbate any pre-existing cervical spine injury by causing reflex withdrawal away from them, although this is a result of holding the smelling salts closer to the nose than recommended. The National Football League banned teams from providing smelling salts to players in 2025, though the use of smelling salts itself was still permitted.
