= Hartshorn =

Antler of male red deer

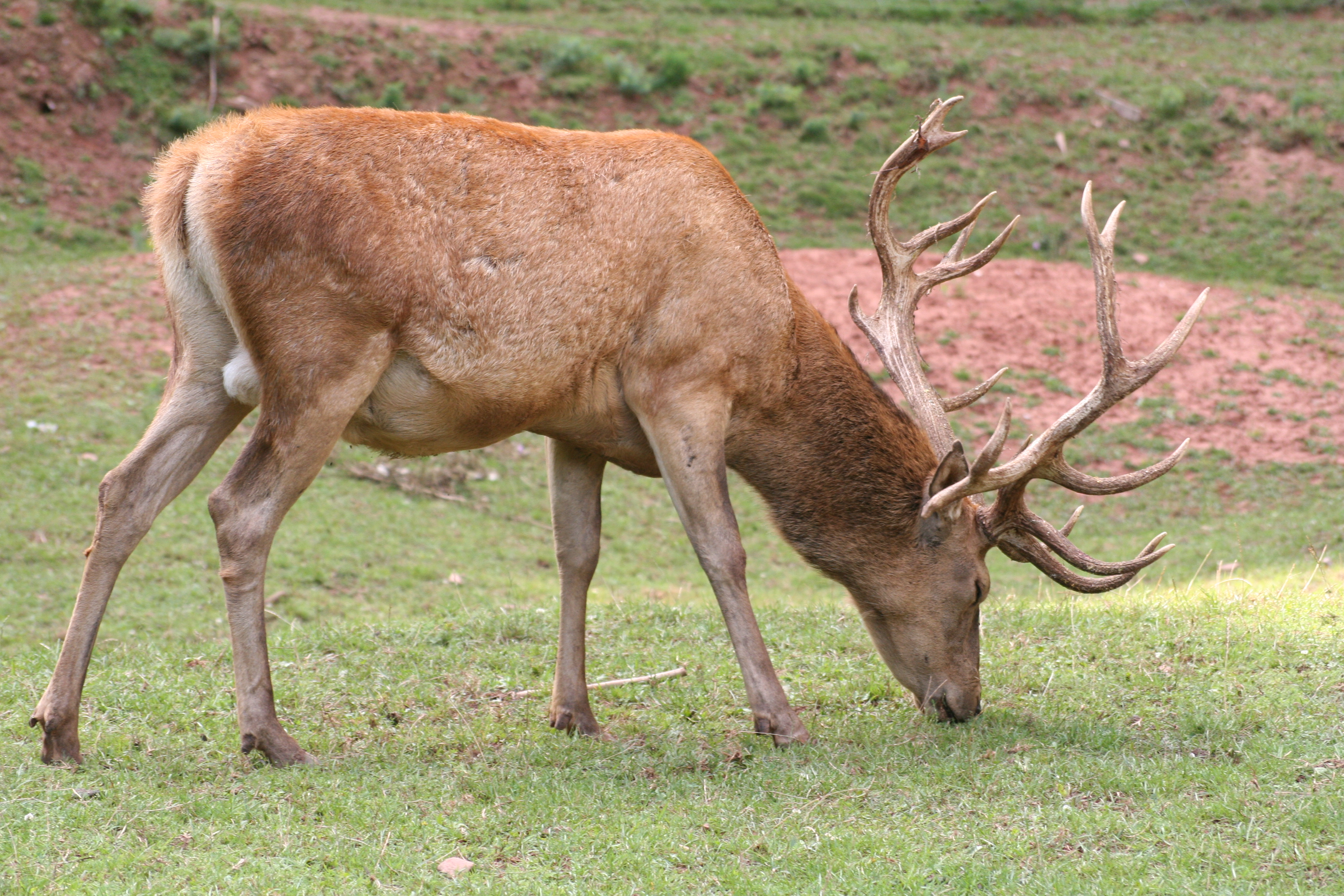
Male red deer

Hartshorn is the antler of male red deer.

== Derivatives ==
Various nitrogen compounds were made from hartshorn shavings:

- Oil of hartshorn is a crude chemical product obtained from the destructive distillation of deer antlers.
- Salt of hartshorn refers to ammonium carbonate, an early form of smelling salts and baking powder obtained by dry distillation of oil of hartshorn.
- Spirit of hartshorn (or spirits of hartshorn) is an archaic name for aqueous ammonia. Originally, this term was applied to a solution manufactured from the hooves and antlers of the red deer, as well as those of some other animals. The aqueous solution was colorless and pungent, consisting of about 28.5 percent ammonia. It was used chiefly as a detergent, for removing stains and extracting certain vegetable coloring agents, and in the manufacture of ammonium salts. Later, the term was applied to the partially purified similar products of the action of heat on nitrogenous animal matter generally. Finally, the term was applied to any aqueous solution of ammonia.

== Uses ==
=== Medicine ===
Hartshorn jelly or a decoction of burnt hartshorn in water was used to treat diarrhea. The coal of hartshorn, called calcinated hartshorn, was used as an absorbent, as well as in the treatment of dysentery. Salt of hartshorn (ammonium carbonate) was used as a sudorific for treatment of fevers, and as a smelling salt. Hartshorn was used to treat insect bites, sunstroke, stye, and snakebites.

=== Baking ===
Hartshorn salt, also known as hartshorn, baker's ammonia, ammonium carbonate and ammonium bicarbonate is used as a leavening agent in baked goods in place of yeast, baking soda and baking powder. It was more popular in the 1700s and prior as a forerunner of the modern baking powder but is still used today in traditional German, Swiss, Polish, Dutch and Nordic recipes such as

- amoniaczki and drömmar (Polish and Swedish sugar cookies)
- loftkökur (Icelandic chocolate cookies)
- hafrakex (Icelandic oatmeal cookies)
- Basler Läckerli (Swiss and German citrus gingerbread)
- speculoos (Dutch, Belgian and German illustrated Christmas cookies, aka windmill cookies)
- Springerle (German illustrated Christmas crackers)
- lefse (Norwegian potato flatbread)

A half-teaspoon of hartshorn salt can substitute for one teaspoon of baking powder, and this is commonly done in Americanized recipes. However hartshorn salt is different from baking powder in that the goods baked with hartshorn salt are crispier, retain intricate designs better, and can be kept out in the open air for longer without becoming stale or hard.

Hartshorn salt and freshly-baked goods made from it smell of ammonia. When heated, the ammonia and carbon dioxide gases are released, and the smell eventually dissipates. The use of hartshorn may turn some ingredients green, such as sunflower seeds.

==== Safety concerns ====
Ammonia released during the baking process reacts with glucose and fructose to form intermediate molecules that in turn, react with asparagine (an amino acid found in nuts, seeds, and whole grains) to form acrylamide, a carcinogen.
