= Ammonia cookie =

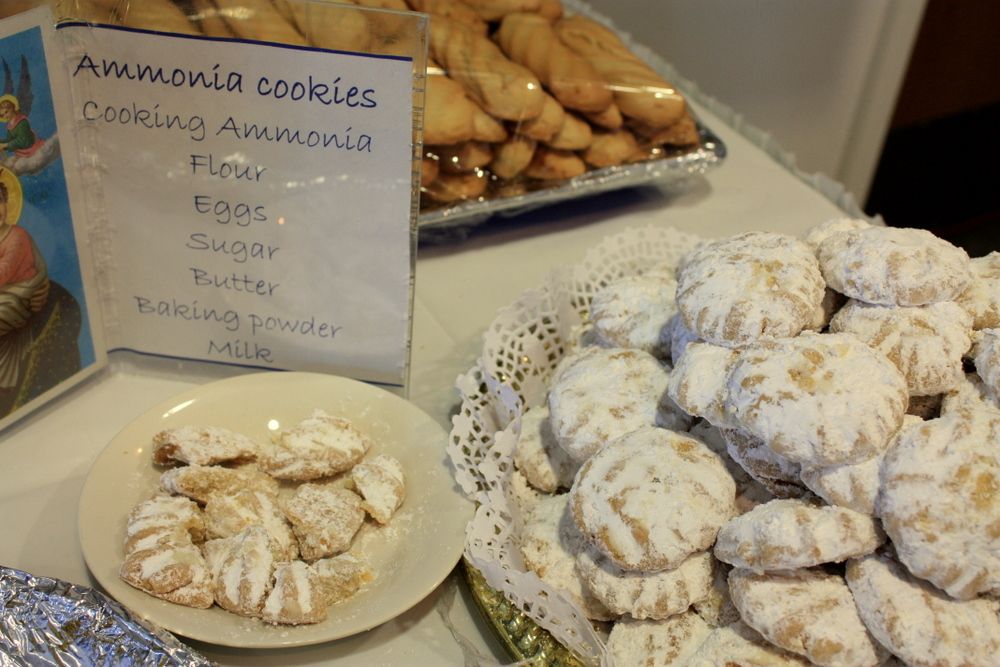
- Type: Cookie
- Main ingredients: ammonium bicarbonate

An ammonia cookie is a cookie made with baking ammonia as a leavener. In the United States, they are most closely associated with Scandinavian-American cooking. It is also found in Polish cooking, where it is known as ciasteczka amoniaczki.
