= Ammonium carbonate =

Chemical used as leavening agent and smelling salt

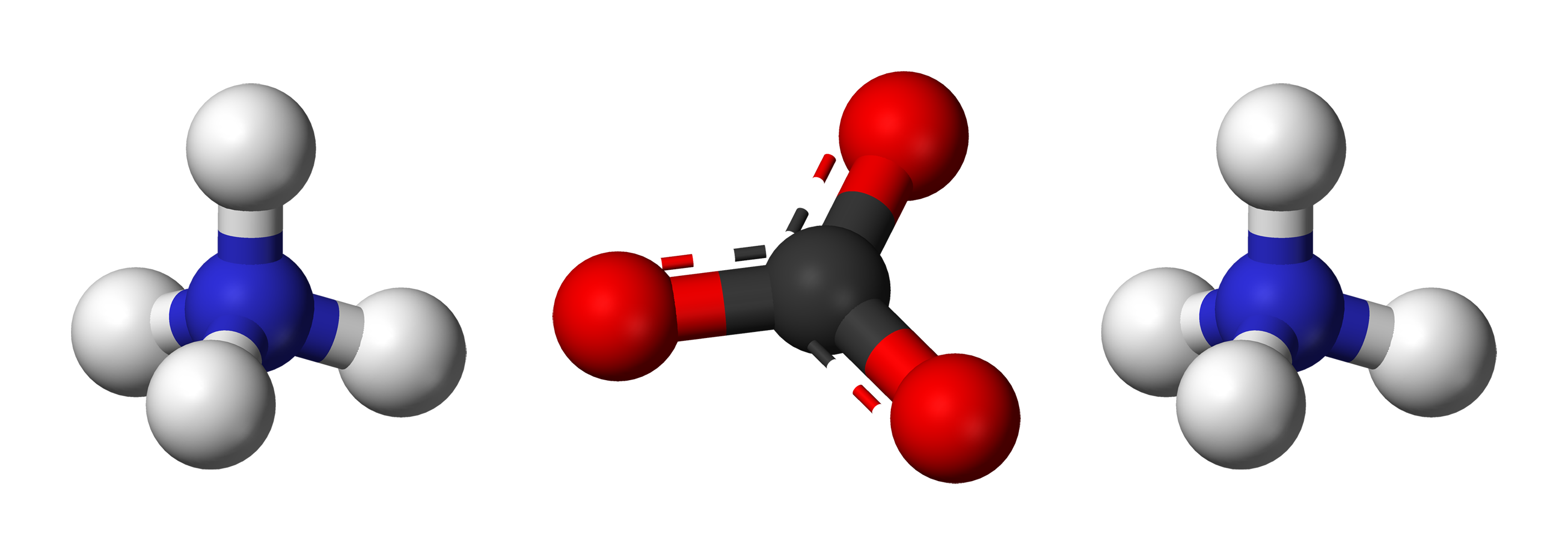
- Ball-and-stick model of two ammonium cations and one carbonate anion

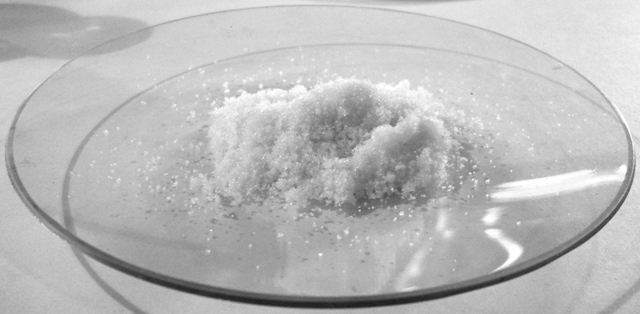

Names
- IUPAC name Ammonium carbonate
- Other names: Baker's ammonia; Sal volatile; Salt of hartshorn; Spirit of Urine; E503

Identifiers
CAS Number	506-87-6; 16799-91-0 (monohydrate)
3D model (JSmol)	Interactive image; Interactive image
ChEBI	CHEBI:229630
ChemSpider	10048
ECHA InfoCard	100.007.326
EC Number	233-786-0
E number	E503(i) (acidity regulators, ...)
IUPHAR/BPS	4509
PubChem CID	517111
UNII	PDP691CN28
UN number	3077
CompTox Dashboard (EPA)	DTXSID5047457
- InChI: InChI=1S/CH2O3.2H3N/c2-1(3)4;;/h(H2,2,3,4);2*1H3 Key: PRKQVKDSMLBJBJ-UHFFFAOYSA-N; InChI=1/CH2O3.2H3N/c2-1(3)4;;/h(H2,2,3,4);2*1H3 Key: PRKQVKDSMLBJBJ-UHFFFAOYAQ
- SMILES: O=C(O)O.N.N; [NH4+].[NH4+].[O-]C(=O)[O-]

Properties
Chemical formula	[NH_{4}]_{2}CO_{3}
Molar mass	96.086 g·mol^{−1}
Appearance	White powder
Density	1.50 g/cm^{3}
Melting point	58 °C (136 °F; 331 K) (decomposes)
Solubility in water	100 g/(100 ml) (15°C); 25 g/(100 ml) (20°C)
Magnetic susceptibility (χ)	−42.50·10^{−6} cm^{3}/mol

Hazards
- Occupational safety and health (OHS/OSH)
Main hazards	Irritant
- GHS labelling
Pictograms	(GHS07: Exclamation mark)
Signal word	Warning
Hazard statements	H302, H319
Safety data sheet (SDS)	External MSDS

Related compounds
Other anions	Ammonium bicarbonate Ammonium carbamate
Other cations	Sodium carbonate Potassium carbonate
- Except where otherwise noted, data are given for materials in their standard state (at 25 °C [77 °F], 100 kPa). verify (what is ?) Infobox references

Ammonium carbonate is a chemical compound with the chemical formula [NH_{4}]_{2}CO_{3}. It is an ammonium salt of carbonic acid. It is composed of ammonium cations [NH_{4}]^{+} and carbonate anions CO^{2−}_{3}. Since ammonium carbonate readily degrades to gaseous ammonia and carbon dioxide upon heating, it is used as a leavening agent and also as smelling salt. It is also known as baker's ammonia and is a predecessor to the more modern leavening agents baking soda and baking powder. It is a component of what was formerly known as sal volatile and salt of hartshorn, and produces a pungent smell when baked. It comes in the form of a white powder or block, with a molar mass of 96.09 g/mol and a density of 1.50 g/cm^{3}. It is a strong electrolyte.

== Production ==
Ammonium carbonate is produced by combining carbon dioxide and aqueous ammonia. About 80,000 tons/year were produced as of 1997.

2 NH_{3} + H_{2}O + CO_{2} → [NH_{4}]_{2}CO_{3}

An orthorhombic ammonium carbonate monohydrate is known ([NH_{4}]_{2}CO_{3}·H_{2}O). It crystallizes in an ammonia solution exposed in a carbon dioxide-rich atmosphere.

=== Decomposition ===
Ammonium carbonate slowly decomposes at standard temperature and pressure through two pathways. Thus any initially pure sample of ammonium carbonate will soon become a mixture including various byproducts.

Ammonium carbonate can spontaneously decompose into ammonium bicarbonate and ammonia:

[NH_{4}]_{2}CO_{3} → [NH_{4}]HCO_{3} + NH_{3}

Which further decomposes to carbon dioxide, water and another molecule of ammonia:

[NH_{4}]HCO_{3} → H_{2}O + CO_{2} + NH_{3}

== Uses ==
=== Leavening agent ===
Ammonium carbonate may be used as a leavening agent in traditional recipes, particularly those from northern Europe and Scandinavia (e.g. Amerikaner, Speculoos, Tunnbröd or Lebkuchen). It was the precursor to today's more commonly used baking powder.

Originally made from ground deer horn and called hartshorn, today it is called baker's ammonia. It is prepared by the sublimation of a mixture of ammonium sulfate and calcium carbonate and occurs as a white powder or a hard, white or translucent mass. It acts as a heat activated leavening agent and breaks down into carbon dioxide (leavening), ammonia (which needs to dissipate) and water. It is sometimes combined with sodium bicarbonate to mimic as a double acting baking powder and to help mask any ammonia smell not baked out.

It also serves as an acidity regulator and has the E number E503. It can be replaced with baking powder, but this may affect both the taste and texture of the finished product. Baker's ammonia should be used to create thin dry baked goods like crackers and cookies. This allows the strong ammonia smell to bake out. It should not be used to make moist baked items like cake since ammonia is hydrophilic and will leave a strong bitter taste.

Its use as a leavening agent, with associated controversy, goes back centuries:

In the third kind of bread, a vesicular appearance is given to it by the addition to the dough of some ammoniacal salt, (usually the sub-carbonate,) which becomes wholly converted into a gaseous substance during the process of baking, causing the dough to swell out into little air vessels, which finally bursting, allow the gas to escape, and leave the bread exceedingly porous. Friedrich Accum, in his Treatise on Culinary Poisons, has stigmatized this process as "fraudulent," but, in our opinion, most unjustly. The bakers would never adopt it but from necessity: when good yeast cannot be procured, it forms an admirable and perfectly harmless substitute; costing the baker more, it diminishes his profit, while the consumer is benefited by the bread retaining the solid matter, which by the process of fermentation is dissipated in the form of ethanol and carbonic acid gas.

=== Other uses ===
Ammonium carbonate is the main component of smelling salts, although the commercial scale of their production is small. Buckley's cough syrup from Canada today uses ammonium carbonate as an active ingredient intended to help relieve symptoms of bronchitis. It is also used as an emetic. It is also found in smokeless tobacco products, and is used in aqueous solution as a photographic lens cleaning agent.

It is also used as bait for apple maggots, to monitor the spread of the infestation and adjust the borders of the Apple Maggot Quarantine Area in Washington State.

== See also ==
- Ammonium bicarbonate
- Ammonium nitrate
- Sal ammoniac, the mineralogical form of ammonium chloride
