= Vinaigrette box =

Small box to hold scented products

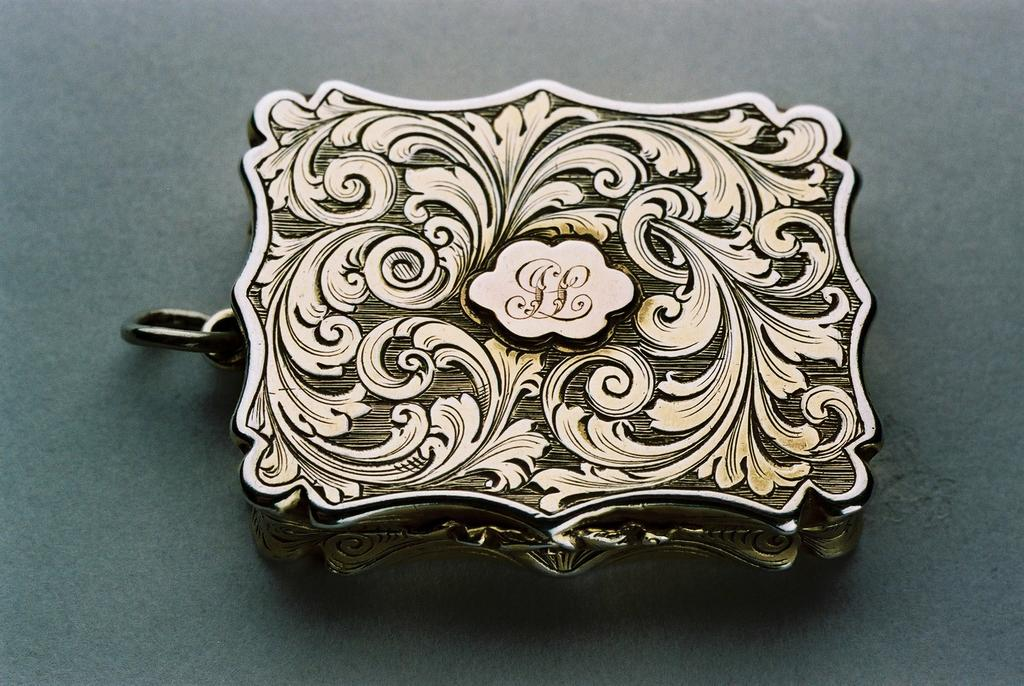
Victorian silver vinaigrette; Nathaniel Mills & Sons, Birmingham, 1847

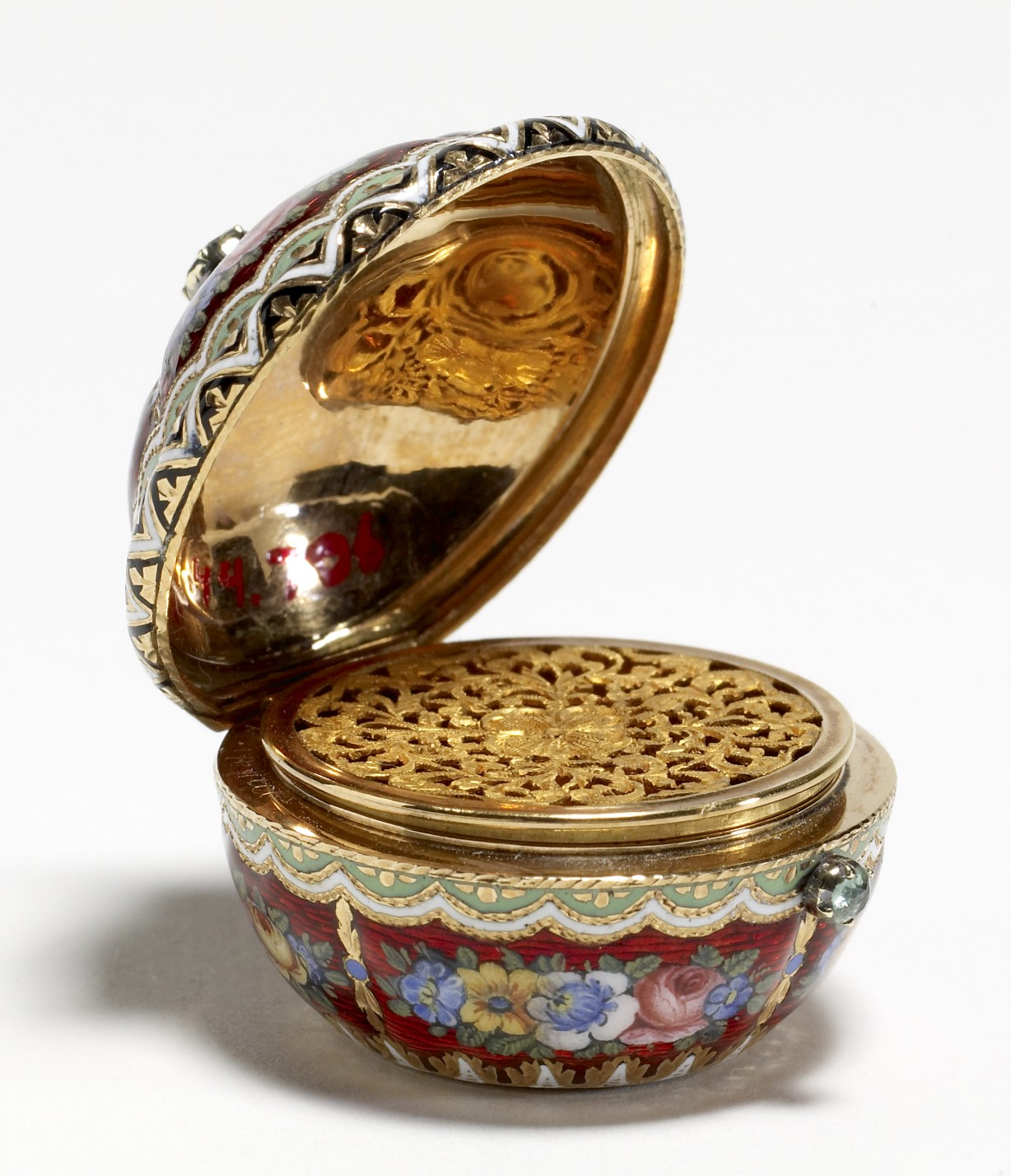
An open vinaigrette (Switzerland, c. 1805)

In goldsmithing and decorative arts, a vinaigrette (also known as a vinaigrette box) is a small container (usually a flat rectangular box, although examples were made in a wide variety of forms) used to store a sponge or piece of cloth soaked in aromatic substances. The vessel is typically made of silver, or occasionally gold or porcelain, and features a perforated grille beneath the lid to hold the sponge in place while allowing the scent to escape. The vinaigrette played a role similar to bottles of smelling salts used as stimulants to restore consciousness after fainting and to mask bad smells.

== History ==
The vinaigrette developed as an offshoot of the pomander, originating as a compartment for aromatic vinegar set into the box or head of the pomander or spice-box, whose other compartments held solid spices. A second ancestor was the vinaigrette cane, a walking stick with a pierced container for aromatic vinegar in its head, believed to have been carried chiefly by physicians and clergymen as a protection against infection. Vinaigrettes replaced the pomander in Europe (starting with France) in the 18th century and were used until the end of the 19th century. During this period, they served as a status symbol for women, who carried them in an inner pocket, a small bag, or suspended from a belt or chatelaine. While primarily associated with the Victorian era and the fashion for tightly laced corsets (which often caused fainting spells requiring restorative scents) their popularity extended back to the 18th century and some use was still noted in the early 1920s. Eileen Ellenbogen argues that the finest pieces date to Georgian/Regency periods, with Victorian era witnessing the decline of the art.

In England, the vinaigrette emerged as an object in its own right between about 1775 and 1790, a development probably connected with the establishment of the Birmingham Assay Office in 1773, since the great majority of hall-marked examples are the work of Birmingham makers. A few isolated earlier pieces are recorded, including examples of 1722–1723 and 1754–1755, but these appear to have been simplified modifications of the still-fashionable pomander. The rise of the new container has also been linked to the launch, around 1785, of a new preparation of aromatic vinegar by Dr. Henry.

Oxford English Dictionary states that the first recorded use of the English word "vinaigrette" in this sense occurred in Laetitia Matilda Hawkins' novel The Countess and Gertrude (1811). Despite the French origin of the word, the word is not used in this sense in French, and such containers are occasionally designated as boîtes- or étuis-à-parfum.

From their earliest days vinaigrettes were exchanged as tokens of affection, with some bearing ornamental inscriptions such as "Souvenir" or "L'Amitié", and many were made to order with the owner's name, initials or family crest worked into the design. Souvenir pieces marking public events are rare but not unknown: the Battle of Trafalgar inspired commemorative designs featuring Nelson's head on the lid or HMS Victory on the grille, and urns, cupids and representations of buildings such as St Paul's Cathedral and Windsor Castle were at various times popular subjects.

The greatest ingenuity of design and execution is found in vinaigrettes made before 1835. They nevertheless remained in use until the end of the 19th century; a Birmingham chemist later recalled that cleaning ladies' vinaigrettes and renewing their sponges with aromatic vinegar was still a routine task for a shop apprentice in 1890. The latest recorded example is dated 1903. During the Second World War, surviving vinaigrettes became popular in Britain as saccharin boxes.

== Design ==
English vinaigrettes vary in length from about half an inch to four or five inches, and generally take the form of a box or locket, though the range of design is effectively unlimited: examples shaped as birds, animals, insects, fish, eggs, nuts, shells, purses, books, fruit and watches are not uncommon. The characteristic feature is the pierced grille or inner lid concealing the perfumed sponge; in rare cases the grille itself forms the lid. Ellenbogen regarded grille design as one of the most reliable indicators of authorship, with individual makers developing distinctive pierced and fretted patterns.

The interior of silver vinaigrettes, including the grille, was frequently gilded (vermeil) to protect the metal from corrosion caused by the acidic nature of the aromatic liquids used. While vinegar (French: vinaigre) was a common base for these scents, giving the object its name, other aromatics such as rose water were also used to dab onto the face or inhale.

Gold and especially silver were the materials most commonly used, but vinaigrettes were sometimes made of pinchbeck, glass, porcelain and stone; the stone examples (often bloodstone, agate, cornelian and topaz or cairngorm) were usually carved in two pieces from the solid stone and bound and hinged with chased gold or silver, and cannot be dated with certainty because their delicate metal frames and grilles could not bear the impress of a hall-mark. Virtually every technique of the goldsmith's craft was employed in their manufacture: chasing, filigree and repoussé work were the most popular forms of decoration among the early makers, with appliqué, beading, engine-turning, moulding, enamelling and gem-setting brought into play later. English makers on the whole favoured a more sober and solid style than their continental contemporaries, and the more ornate, jewelled and enamelled vinaigrettes are almost always of continental manufacture.

Dual-purpose boxes or lockets combining a vinaigrette with a patch-box or a hair-locket were fairly common, the latter especially in Victorian times.

== Makers ==
By far the greater number of hall-marked vinaigrettes are the work of Birmingham makers, with many notable designs produced by the Birmingham toy industry between 1800 and 1850. English vinaigrettes fall broadly into two categories: pieces solidly made of gold or silver which bear a hall-mark, and pieces which are unmarked (either made of other materials, or with surfaces too elaborately wrought to leave space for marking, or made in the shape of a locket or another article exempt from hall-marking), thus creating a complete list of makers is impossible. The principal makers discussed by Eileen Ellenbogen are:

- Samuel Pemberton (Birmingham)
- Matthew Linwood (Birmingham)
- John Shaw (Birmingham)
- John Turner (Birmingham)
- Cocks and Bettridge, later John Bettridge alone (Birmingham)
- William Pugh (Birmingham)
- William Eley (London)
- Joseph Willmore (Birmingham)
- Thomas Newbold (Birmingham)
- Lawrence and Co. (Birmingham)
- Thomas Shaw (Birmingham)
- Ledsam, Vale and Wheeler, succeeded by Gervase Wheeler (Birmingham)

== Sources ==
- Bayerischer Rundfunk (6 May 2017). "Vinaigrette - Um das Jahr 1840 entstanden" [Vinaigrette - Created around 1840] (in German). Bayerischer Rundfunk. Archived from the original on 6 May 2017.
- McCrory, P (2006). "Smelling Salts". British Journal of Sports Medicine. 40 (8): 659–660. doi:10.1136/bjsm.2006.029710. PMC 2579444. PMID 16864561.
- Groom, Nigel (1992). "Vinaigrette". The Perfume Handbook. Springer Science & Business Media. p. 248.
- "History in Showcases". The Chemist and Druggist: 49. February 1922.
- Ellenbogen, Eileen (1956). English Vinaigrettes. Cambridge: Golden Head Press.
- Middleton, L. I. (November 1932). "The Vinaigrette". The Connoisseur. 90: 308–314.
- Ellenbogen, Eileen (1959). "Vinaigrettes". In L.G.G. Ramsey (ed.). The Concise Encyclopedia of Antiques. Vol. 4. London. pp. 261–264.
