= Ammonium bicarbonate =

- 2D model of ammonium bicarbonate

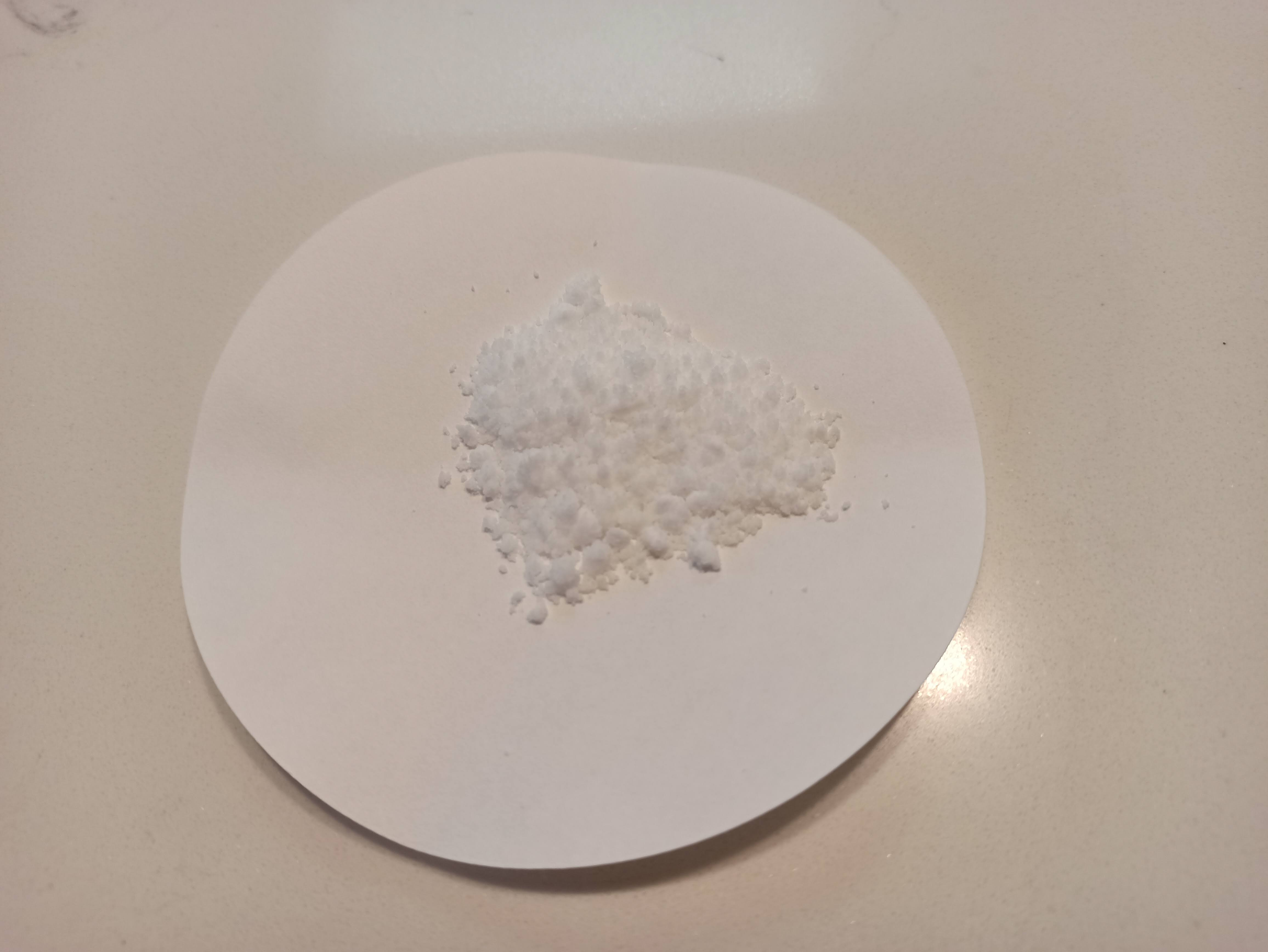

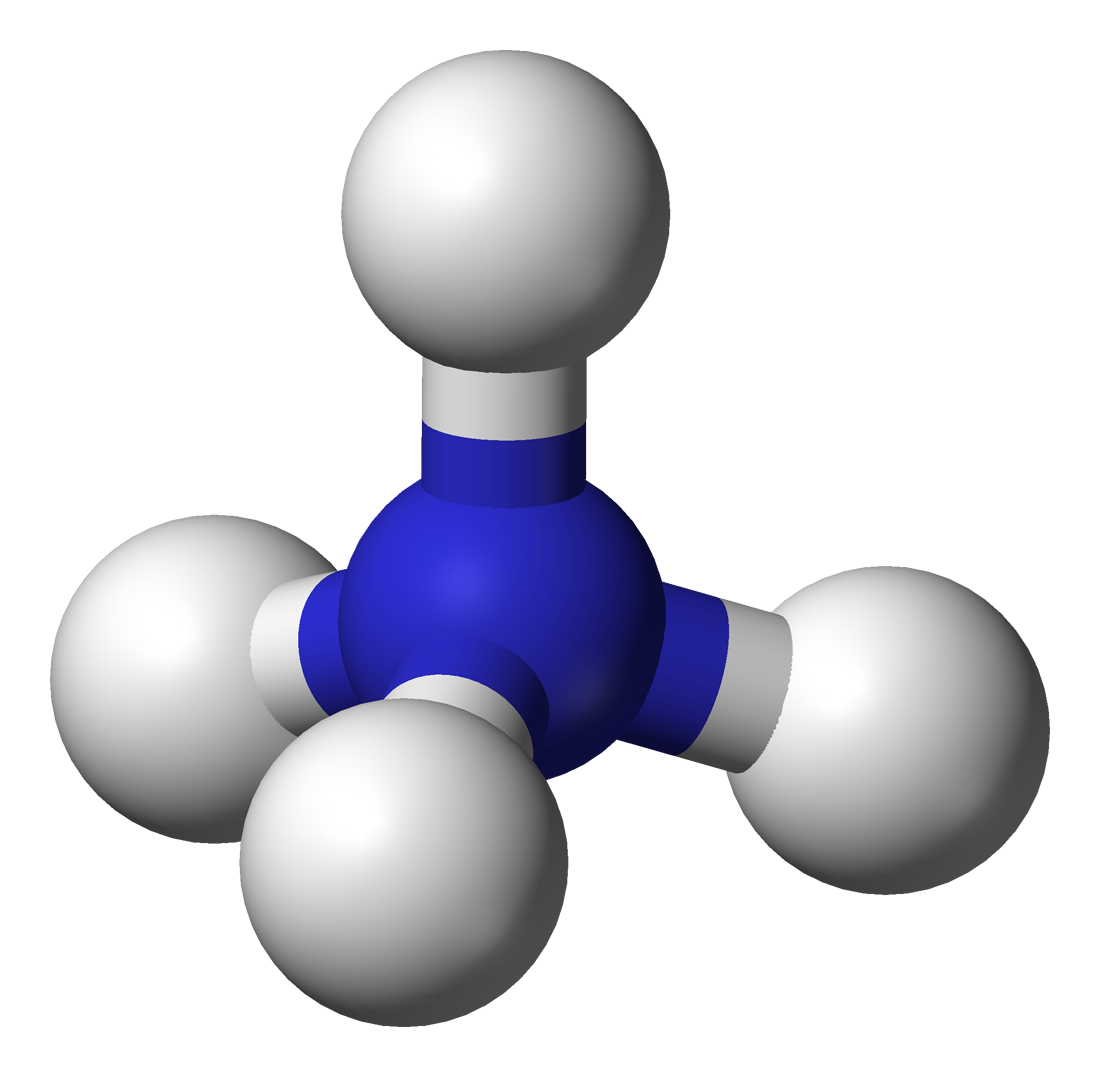
Ball-and-stick model of the ammonium cation
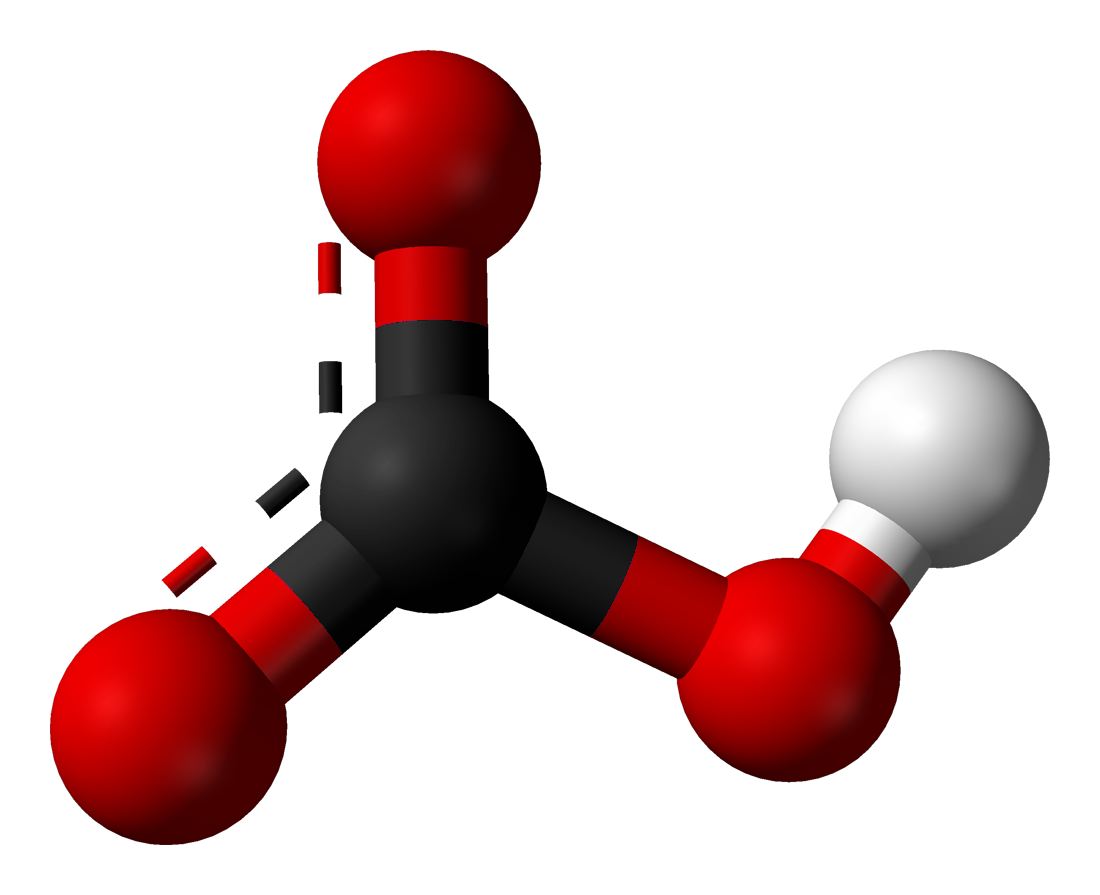
Ball-and-stick model of the bicarbonate anion

Names
- IUPAC name Ammonium hydrogen carbonate
- Other names Bicarbonate of ammonia, ammonium bicarbonate, hartshorn, AmBic, powdered baking ammonia

Identifiers
CAS Number	1066-33-7
3D model (JSmol)	Interactive image
ChemSpider	13395
ECHA InfoCard	100.012.647
EC Number	213-911-5
E number	E503(ii) (acidity regulators, ...)
PubChem CID	14013
RTECS number	BO8600000
UNII	45JP4345C9
UN number	3077
CompTox Dashboard (EPA)	DTXSID5035618
- InChI: InChI=1S/CH2O3.H3N/c2-1(3)4;/h(H2,2,3,4);1H3 Key: ATRRKUHOCOJYRX-UHFFFAOYSA-N; InChI=1/CH2O3.H3N/c2-1(3)4;/h(H2,2,3,4);1H3 Key: ATRRKUHOCOJYRX-UHFFFAOYAW
- SMILES: [O-]C(=O)O.[NH4+]

Properties
Chemical formula	NH_{4}HCO_{3}
Molar mass	79.055 g·mol^{−1}
Density	1.586 g/cm^{3}
Melting point	41.9 °C (107.4 °F; 315.0 K) decomposes
Solubility in water	11.9 g/100 mL (0 °C); 21.6 g/100 mL (20 °C); 24.8 g/100 mL (25 °C); 36.6 g/100 mL (40 °C)
Solubility	insoluble in methanol

Hazards
- Occupational safety and health (OHS/OSH)
Main hazards	Decomposes to release ammonia
- GHS labelling
Pictograms	(GHS07: Exclamation mark)
Signal word	Warning
Hazard statements	H302
Precautionary statements	P264, P270, P301+P312, P330, P501
NFPA 704 (fire diamond)	2 0 0
Flash point	Nonflammable
Safety data sheet (SDS)	ICSC 1333

Related compounds
Other anions	Ammonium carbonate
Other cations	Sodium bicarbonate Potassium bicarbonate
- Except where otherwise noted, data are given for materials in their standard state (at 25 °C [77 °F], 100 kPa). verify (what is ?) Infobox references

Ammonium bicarbonate is an inorganic compound with formula (NH_{4})HCO_{3}. It is the bicarbonate salt of the ammonium ion. It is a colourless solid that degrades readily to carbon dioxide, water and ammonia.

== Production ==
Ammonium bicarbonate is produced by combining carbon dioxide and ammonia:

CO_{2} + NH_{3} + H_{2}O → (NH_{4})HCO_{3}

Since ammonium bicarbonate is thermally unstable, the reaction solution is kept cold, which allows the precipitation of the product as white solid. About 100,000 tons were produced in this way in 1997.

Ammonia gas passed into a strong aqueous solution of the sesquicarbonate (a 2:1:1 mixture of (NH_{4})HCO_{3}, (NH_{4})_{2}CO_{3}, and H_{2}O) converts it into normal ammonium carbonate ((NH_{4})_{2}CO_{3}), which can be obtained in the crystalline condition from a solution prepared at about 30 °C. This compound on exposure to air gives off ammonia and reverts to ammonium bicarbonate.

=== Salt of hartshorn ===
Compositions containing ammonium carbonate have long been known. They were once produced commercially, formerly known as sal volatile or salt of hartshorn. It was obtained by the dry distillation of nitrogenous organic matter such as hair, horn, leather. In addition to ammonium bicarbonate, this material contains ammonium carbamate (NH_{4}CO_{2}NH_{2}), and ammonium carbonate ((NH_{4})_{2}CO_{3}). It is sometimes called ammonium sesquicarbonate. It possesses a strong ammoniacal smell, and on digestion with alcohol, the carbonate is dissolved leaving a residue of ammonium bicarbonate.

A similar decomposition takes place when the sesquicarbonate is exposed to air.

== Uses ==
Ammonium bicarbonate is used in the food industry as a leavening agent for flat baked goods, such as cookies and crackers. It was commonly used in the home before modern-day baking powder was made available. Many baking cookbooks, especially from Scandinavian countries, may still refer to it as hartshorn or hornsalt, while it is known as "hirvensarvisuola" in Finnish, "hjortetakksalt" or "hornsalt" in Norwegian, "hjortetakssalt" in Danish, "hjorthornssalt" in Swedish, and "Hirschhornsalz" in German (lit., "salt of hart's horn"). Although there is a slight smell of ammonia during baking, this quickly dissipates, leaving no taste. It is used in, for example, Swedish "drömmar" biscuits and Danish "klejner" Christmas biscuits, and German Lebkuchen. In many cases it may be replaced with baking soda or baking powder, or a combination of both, depending on the recipe composition and leavening requirements. Compared to baking soda or potash, hartshorn has the advantage of producing more gas for the same amount of agent, and of not leaving any salty or soapy taste in the finished product, as it completely decomposes into water and gaseous products that evaporate during baking. It cannot be used for moist, bulky baked goods however, such as normal bread or cakes, since some ammonia will be trapped inside and will cause an unpleasant taste. It has been assigned E number E503 for use as a food additive in the European Union.

It is commonly used as an inexpensive nitrogen fertilizer in China, but is now being phased out in favor of urea for quality and stability. This compound is used as a component in the production of fire-extinguishing compounds, pharmaceuticals, dyes, pigments, and it is also a basic fertilizer, being a source of ammonia. Ammonium bicarbonate is still widely used in the plastics and rubber industry, in the manufacture of ceramics, in chrome leather tanning, and for the synthesis of catalysts.

It is also used for buffering solutions to make them slightly alkaline during chemical purification, such as high-performance liquid chromatography. Because it entirely decomposes to volatile compounds, this allows rapid recovery of the compound of interest by freeze-drying. Relatedly it is also useful as an alkaline buffering agent for analytical LC–MS as its volatility allows it to be rapidly removed automatically from the sample stream in the low pressure spray chambers used by many standard mass spectrometry detectors found at the end of typical LC-MS systems, such as electrospray ionization detectors. This is critical as most mass spectrometry detectors become signal saturated or even damaged with more than a trace amount of ions entering the detector proper at any one time. This issue limits buffering agents and other additives in LC-MS buffers to either extremely trace concentrations or to fairly volatile compounds. In pH ranges from about 7 to 9, ammonium bicarbonate is one of the only options available as the primary buffering agent for most LC-MS buffers.

Ammonium bicarbonate is also a key component of the expectorant cough syrup "Senega and Ammonia".

It's also used as an attractant for catching insects such as the walnut husk fly (Rhagoletis completa).

== Reactions ==
It dissolves in water to give a mildly alkaline solution. It is insoluble in acetone and alcohols.

Ammonium bicarbonate decomposes above about 36 °C into ammonia, carbon dioxide, and water in an endothermic process and so causes a drop in the temperature of the water:

NH_{4}HCO_{3} → NH_{3} + H_{2}O + CO_{2}

When treated with acids, ammonium salts are also produced:

NH_{4}HCO_{3} + HCl → NH_{4}Cl + CO_{2} + H_{2}O

Reaction with base produces ammonia.

It reacts with sulfates of alkaline-earth metals precipitating their carbonates:

CaSO_{4} + 2 NH_{4}HCO_{3} → CaCO_{3} + (NH_{4})_{2}SO_{4} + CO_{2} + H_{2}O

It also reacts with alkali metal halides, giving alkali metal bicarbonate and ammonium halide:

NH_{4}HCO_{3} + NaCl → NH_{4}Cl + NaHCO_{3}
NH_{4}HCO_{3} + KI → NH_{4}I + KHCO_{3}
NH_{4}HCO_{3} + NaBr → NH_{4}Br + NaHCO_{3}

== Natural occurrence ==
The compound occurs in nature as an exceedingly rare mineral teschemacherite. It can also be obtained from deer antlers.

== Safety ==
Ammonium bicarbonate is an irritant to the skin, eyes and respiratory system. Short-term health effects may occur immediately or shortly after exposure to ammonium bicarbonate. Breathing ammonium bicarbonate can irritate the nose, throat and lungs causing coughing, wheezing and/or shortness of breath. Repeated exposure may cause bronchitis to develop with cough, and/or shortness of breath. Health effects can occur some time after exposure to ammonium bicarbonate and can last for months or years.

Where possible, operations should be enclosed and the use of local exhaust ventilation at the site of chemical release is recommended. If local exhaust ventilation or enclosure is not used, respirators are necessary. Wear protective work clothing and change clothes and wash thoroughly immediately after exposure to ammonium bicarbonate.

Ammonium bicarbonate from China used to make cookies was found to be contaminated with melamine, and imports were banned in Malaysia following the 2008 Chinese milk scandal.
