= The Osbournes season 2 =

The Osbournes
- Season 2
- DVD covers for The Osbournes - The 2nd Season and The Osbournes 2 1/2
- No. of episodes: 20

Release
- Original network: MTV
- Original release: December 3, 2002 – August 10, 2003

Season chronology
- ← Previous; Season 1

The second season of the reality series The Osbournes premiered on MTV on December 3, 2002, and concluded on August 12, 2003, consisting of a total of 20 episodes. This season was split into two parts with a total of 10 episodes for each part. The series follows the lives of Ozzy Osbourne and his family. The DVD release billed the first half as The Osbournes - The 2nd Season while the remaining 10 episodes were billed as The Osbournes 2 1/2.

== Episodes ==
No. overall	No. in season	Title	Original release date
Part 1
11	1	"What Goes Up..."	December 3, 2002
Sharon and the dogs are in the backyard. Lola the bulldog then vomits on the grass. Ozzy then tries to show off his knife throwing skills by trying to throw knives into logs. As Jack is in the car going somewhere he makes a call saying there are fans on the lawn and the sprinklers should be turned on to scare them away. Sharon then shows Melinda a gold filling that she had accidentally swallowed. Ozzy then announces that he and Sharon have been invited to Washington DC for a press dinner at the White House. Ozzy doesn't know how to handle it and he doesn't know proper etiquette, he's a street guy. Sharon helps Ozzy pick out a watch to wear. Jack then announces that Kelly has covered Madonna's "Papa Don't Preach" and that she would be singing it at the MTV Movie Awards. This leads to a scene of Ozzy dancing with Kelly while the song plays in the background. Jack then tells us that he had a part in Kelly getting signed to a record contract and Kelly discusses that she doesn't want a chick band. Ozzy and Sharon leave to go to Washington and Sharon tells Ozzy that she got President Bush some cuff-links as a gift. Ozzy asks how is she going to give The President a gift. Ozzy says that he's the President...he's not allowed to accept gifts. They arrive in Washington and drive past the Washington Monument and Lincoln Monument. Sharon admits that she doesn't know who President Bush is and that Ozzy is starting to get stage fright. Back home, Jack continues his playful attitude with fans and the sprinklers. Kelly then goes to rehearsal and she steals Jack's spritz bottle. Jack tells Kelly, "Just because you have a hit song doesn't mean you can steal my spritz bottle." Back in Washington, Ozzy and Sharon are getting ready for their dinner and Sharon says that Ozzy looks like Harrison Ford. Ozzy says he looks more like Glenn Close. He then calls Sharon a cunt, but then quickly apologizes. He then looks into the camera and says, "I found out you can say anything to a woman. But you mention the "C" word and you suddenly get this feeling of death come over you." At the dinner President Bush says, "What a fantastic audience we have tonight. Washington power brokers, celebrities, Hollywood stars, Ozzy Osbourne." Then causes Ozzy to stand up with a big smile on his face and the crowd applauds him. Ozzy then flies to England and Sharon joins Kelly and Jack. At the movie awards, all the attention goes to Kelly, while Jack is on a quest to find Natalie Portman. Ozzy introduces Kelly and she does a great performance. That night on the ride home they pass a McDonald's and Jack is happy to see that the McRib is back. This irks Kelly and he tells Kelly that it's the little things in life that make people happy. The episode then ends with Jack continuing his antics with people outside his house with sprinklers and Kelly flies to New York to promote her album.
12	2	"Must Come Down"	December 3, 2002
Sharon recuperates at the family's Malibu beach house while undergoing treatment for colon cancer. She vows to beat the disease, and tries to maintain as normal a life as possible. Everyone talks about their reactions to the news of her diagnosis. Ozzy struggles to remain sober while on tour with Ozzfest. He had already been going through detox, and the news of Sharon's illness has made a difficult situation much worse. A family friend/employee tries to help Ozzy by helping him get into yoga and reading him poetry, but Ozzy is decidedly less than impressed. Some people try to talk to him about how religion helped them overcome their addictions, but he does not want any part of it. He is terrified by the prospect of losing Sharon, and doesn't want to be away from her. However, he elects to tough it out and stay on tour because he doesn't want to cause Sharon any further stress. Ozzy comes home for a few days during a break in the tour. Sharon tries to have a fire going in the fireplace for his arrival, but it ends up getting a little bit out of control. Jack takes up surfing while on vacation. He and his friends jump off a pier, but Jack winds up breaking his elbow.
13	3	"The Ozz Man and the Sea"	December 17, 2002
Kelly travels to Europe for a series of interviews and appearances. She is upset when her bag is lost (apparently seized by security because of concerns over her gun-shaped pin), leaving her without any extra underwear. She first visits Germany, where she deals with several adoring fans and tries to fake her way through a radio interview conducted in German ("That's amazing. I always don't know what to say"). Kelly then goes to England to perform "Papa Don't Preach" on Top of the Pops. Jack heads to North Carolina to film a guest spot for Dawson's Creek. Sharon is depressed about the fact that everyone is away at the same time. Ozzy tries to cheer her up by building a fire outside the beach house so that she can spend some time outside. The fire department gives him some advice on building a pit for the fire, but the ocean is not very cooperative ("Fuck! Go to Alaska! No, no, no, no. You fucking asshole ocean! No!"). When the fire finally gets going, Ozzy gives Sharon a good laugh when he tries to catch a fish in the ocean—and ends up falling on his butt.
14	4	"Beauty and the Bert"	January 3, 2003
Kelly begins dating Bert McCracken, lead singer of the band The Used. Sharon worries after hearing some stories about Bert ("They call him cauliflower dick. Cauliflower dick!? Don't you get that from Virg-, Virginia, Virginial, Venereal disease mum. Venereal disease! Why do I keep thinking fucking Virginial?"), while Jack thinks that Bert is weird because he professed his love to Kelly after only a few weeks of dating. Kelly warns that she will run off to Vegas and marry before the end of the year. Sharon actually encourages this, saying that she needs some excitement. Sharon worries about the situation, but Ozzy encourages her to relax and just focus on living one day at a time. Sharon wants Bert to stay at the house (and sleep in Jack's room) when his band comes to town. Kelly refuses to bring him over to meet the family because she fears they will threaten or embarrass him. She finally tries to sneak him into the house, but Sharon catches them. She asks Bert about his nickname, leaving Kelly mortified. Meanwhile, Ozzy has more problems with the television set, which winds up stuck on a cooking channel (or the Bread Baking Channel, as he calls it). He develops a strange fascination for the series Two Fat Ladies.
15	5	"Smell Like Teen Spirits"	January 14, 2002
Sharon makes amends with her father after not speaking with him for over twenty years. Kelly keeps going out and getting drunk every night, despite Sharon's pleas. Ozzy tries to warn her of the consequences of her actions, as they can't protect her if she gets arrested for underage drinking. Pop star Mandy Moore comes over to the house to hang out with Jack. Jack also spends a lot of time partying, and ignores his trainer's repeated efforts to get him to change his lifestyle. Kelly and Robert annoy Ozzy when they disturb his sleep with their loud, drunken behavior. Sharon's father tries to give her advice on how to rein in the kids. Kelly becomes very ill after drinking too much, and claims that she is going to stay in all weekend. Sharon intentionally tortures her throughout her hangover by talking about disgusting food items. Ozzy becomes a grandfather when his oldest daughter, Jessica, has a baby girl. Ozzy later becomes addicted to burritos ("Your father can't eat just 1 burrito, he has to have 900 burritos").
16	6	"Meow Means No!"	January 21, 2003
Kelly recruits her friend Sarah to play the drums in her band. However, Sarah has never had any formal lessons, and can't seem to keep up with the others during rehearsals. Everyone becomes very frustrated, and reaches the conclusion that Sarah must be replaced by someone with more experience. Kelly can't bring herself to fire her friend, so Sharon volunteers to handle it. Sarah gets $10,000 for her services, and a job handling the slate during the filming of Kelly's video for "Shut Up." Dill returns to town, and Jack invites him to stay at the house. Ozzy is not thrilled about this, but doesn't stand in his way. Dill and Jack engage in a political debate that seems to bore the rest of their friends. They later engage in a bizarre wrestling match in the driveway that finds them stripping half-naked. One of the dogs, Arthur, becomes too frisky as he deals with leftover "feelings" after being fixed. The family believes that Arthur has raped Gus the cat, although a veterinarian insists that this is impossible.
17	7	"It's a Hard Knock Life"	January 21, 2003
Kelly grows frustrated with all of the appearances she must make as a recording artist. She yells and screams at everyone. Sharon sympathizes with her, noting that she just wants to be a teenager and is having a hard time handling all of the demands being placed on her. She asks Ozzy to go talk to Kelly and reassure her. Kelly quickly sends him scampering away as she throws a screaming fit. Kelly flies to New York to work on her album. She does a photo shoot for Vanity Fair, and ends up storming off and having another tantrum. She later meets P.Diddy at a party. He asks her to be his guest and gives her an expensive watch as an apology after one of his security guards knocks her down. Sharon becomes fascinated with the idea of becoming P.Diddy's mother-in-law, and embarrasses Kelly by refusing to stop talking about it. Ozzy and Kelly listen to some of her songs together. He tells her that she has done well and expresses his pride. Meanwhile, Jack has problems with a band that he is trying to sign, as the guitar player is very reluctant to hand over the demos.
18	8	"Cleanliness is Next to Ozyness"	January 28, 2003
Ozzy grows increasingly tired of the dogs and their tendency to defecate in the house. Because Sharon's immune system is very weak due to the chemo, he fears that all of the germs will cause her to develop an infection. He constantly cleans everything and tries to get everyone to wear gloves around Sharon. He also urges Sharon not to let the dogs on the bed, but she ignores him. Ozzy meets with a contractor about plans to build an outdoor kennel for all of the dogs, but Sharon quickly kills this idea. Jack and Sharon argue when she insists on going out to dinner. He believes she should rest, but she is feeling well and can't stand to be cooped up in the house. Sharon takes Robert shopping for furniture for his new room. She explains that Robert was a good friend to Aimee and Kelly after the Osbournes moved from England, so they have taken him in after his mother's death (from colon cancer). Jack bonds with Robert and shows him how to make one of his favorite treats, beans on toast. Sharon goes to the doctor. At a special dinner that night, she announces that her cancer is in remission and that she will finish her treatment in January.
19	9	"Viva Ozz-Vegas"	February 4, 2003
The Osbournes pack their bags for Sin City as Ozzy prepares for a concert and Kelly celebrates her 18th birthday. Before heading to Vegas, Kelly discovers that she has been made to sign a contract with The Venetian Resort Hotel Casino as the hotel clearly states that if anyone is seen to be drinking underage, then they would all be thrown out of the hotel. The family charter a private jet to Vegas. When Kelly and friend Sara head out for a wild night on the town, Jack gets left behind because he's still not of legal age. Jack is deeply annoyed by this as he had been told by a friend that they would all be meeting "some Penthouse chicks" while in Vegas. As Jack watches television with some friends, Kelly and Sara run wild. Shocking onlookers with a revealing table dance before falling to the floor in front of a disapproving Ozzy and Sharon, Sara horrifies onlookers shortly before Kelly and Jack go toe-to-toe.
20	10	"My Big Fat Jewish Wedding"	February 11, 2003
Sharon and Ozzy decide to renew their wedding vows at a hotel on New Year's Eve. Kelly is to serve as flower girl, with Jack and Robert as ushers. Kelly objects to the fact that the ceremony will be conducted by a rabbi; although Sharon's father is Jewish, Kelly insists that a person cannot be Jewish unless their mother is (Sharon: "Excuse me, my husband is circumcised"). Ozzy is not at all enthused about the ceremony. Kelly and Sarah are less than impressed with Jack's latest female "friend," particularly because she once dated Jack's best friend. Sharon catches the girl in bed with Jack, and later finds condoms in the room. She tries to encourage Jack to settle down and find a steady girlfriend, but he would rather juggle several girls because the idea of a relationship freaks him out. Ozzy and Jack have various body parts plucked, shaved and waxed before the wedding. Sharon recalls the couple's first wedding night, when Ozzy passed out drunk in the hallway. Ozzy insists that he will not drink this time. Sharon recites her own vows, leaving Ozzy clearly touched. The hotel hosts a celebrity-filled reception. Sharon is especially excited about the presence of Justin Timberlake. She asks him to marry Kelly. Ozzy gets completely plastered, causing mayhem such as making out with Marilyn Manson. History repeats itself, as Ozzy falls asleep on a couch and Sharon laments that she has again been cheated out of her wedding night.
Part 2
21	11	"What a Boy Wants"	June 10, 2003
The Osbournes struggle to come up with a gift for Jack's birthday. Kelly strongly objects when Jack dances with Christina Aguilera, whom Kelly had previously insulted on a number of occasions. Kelly complains that Jack is disrespecting her by hanging around someone that she dislikes, and insists that she would never do this to Jack. Jack tries to explain that Christina actually had nice things to say about Kelly. The kids get into a brawl, which Sharon must break up. Meanwhile, Ozzy visits the dentist and gets intoxicated from the nitrous oxide, and he appears to take the rinse water and pours it over his ear. The family visits a medieval-themed club to celebrate Jack's birthday, and buys him a knight suit. Jack tries out his new sword by dueling with a buddy in the street.
22	12	"Fleas a Crowd"	June 17, 2003
The pets suffer from a flea infestation, creating havoc around the house and leaving everyone itchy and miserable. Kelly prepares to go on a trip to Philadelphia to visit her boyfriend, Bert. Sharon does not want her to go away alone (she prefers her to have security at all times), and drives Kelly crazy as she somewhat jokingly nags her. Sharon has Robert and Jack move a heavy statue out to the garden, but never seems satisfied by the location. She forces them to move it several times. The house is redecorated, and Ozzy finds himself extremely bewildered by a giant statue of a hand. Kelly goes against her parents' wishes and gets a nose ring, which Sharon wants her to remove. Kelly later mistakes the nose ring for something on her nose and accidentally flicks it out.
23	13	"Run Ozzy Run"	June 24, 2003
Ozzy continues to work out with his trainer, Pete, who Ozzy jokes may be a robot because he never stops talking, sweats, eats or goes to the bathroom. Ozzy is to run five miles on his 54th birthday. He runs almost two miles before he is stopped by a foot injury. The family throws a party for Ozzy's birthday, complete with a fireworks display by Jack and Robert. Ozzy eventually tries to run the five miles again, and succeeds this time. Meanwhile, Ozzy has problems with his new car, as the voice recognition system can't understand a word he says.
24	14	"Fists of Fury"	July 1, 2003
Ozzy and Sharon prepare to leave for a few days on a Hawaiian vacation. Ozzy tells Jack that he is no longer to have people over at the house after 11 PM. Kelly is afraid that Jack will turn the house into a nonstop party while their parents are gone. Sharon promises to talk to him, but this does little to reassure Kelly. Jack has a lot of people over late at night, and they soon begin using the pool and making a lot of noise. Kelly becomes very upset because she is tired of Jack and his friends keeping her from sleeping. He refuses to listen to Melinda when she asks them to be quiet. When Kelly confronts Jack, he dares her to hit him, so she nails him in the face. They get into a fight, and the staff has to pry them apart. Kelly calls Sharon for sympathy, but Jack gets on the line and complains about the cuts to the face he sustained from the punch. Kelly feels Jack deserved what he got; Melinda agrees somewhat, but warns Kelly to be careful about her temper. Sharon and Ozzy come home, and Sharon teases Kelly about the incident. Kelly and Jack quickly patch things up, as they hang out in the kitchen and share some Easy Mac.
25	15	"Mama, I'm Staying Home"	July 8, 2003
Ozzy decides to stay home while Sharon, Melinda and the kids travel to New York. Sharon hopes that Ozzy and Robert will spend more time together, but the two mostly avoid one another because they have little in common. Robert spends a lot of time listening to music and dancing in his guest house, and Ozzy cannot get one of the songs out of his head. Ozzy buys a lot of kitchenware, and spends over $600 on candy for Sharon. Meanwhile, Melinda learns that she is pregnant, and annoys Kelly by talking about her pregnancy nonstop. Kelly also gets into a playful wrestling match with Sharon.
26	16	"Tennis Racket"	July 15, 2003
Sharon receives a peace offering from one of her folk-singing neighbors, but the neighbors on the other side begin to drive the family crazy by playing tennis at all hours of the day and night. Jack tries playing drums outside, and Ozzy blasts the loudest, most obnoxious music he can find. However, nothing seems to have an effect on the neighbors. Jack shoots at the court with his paintball gun, leading to a visit from the police. Sharon suspects that the neighbors are responsible when three of the Osbournes' cats disappear, although the coyotes seem the more likely culprit. Kelly brings home another cat, but Ozzy isn't very happy about it.
27	17	"A Little Ditty About Jack and Brienann"	July 22, 2003
Jack visits the home of singer/actress Courtney Love. He begins dating Kurt Cobain's sister Brieann, who is staying with Courtney. They get along very well, and Jack teaches her some of his favorite recipes, including beans on toast. Sharon is touched to learn that Jack has a tattoo of the word "Mum" with a heart around it. (He got it right after she was diagnosed with cancer.) Ozzy tries out some song lyrics on Sharon, who is busy shopping at the time. He later plays a demo of the new song for Jack and Brieann. Ozzy is bewildered by a rotisserie turkey as it cooks in the kitchen.
28	18	"Angler Management"	July 29, 2003
After 17 years of waiting, Ozzy fulfills his dream of taking Jack on a fishing trip. They get in trouble with the captain for throwing firecrackers at the pelicans. Everyone on board places bets on who can catch the largest fish, and a friend of Jack's wins the contest. Ozzy winds up catching some tin cans and a bird. He also momentarily mistakes a seal for a shark. Nevertheless, they both have a great time on the trip.
29	19	"Bye Bye Babies"	August 5, 2003
Jack and Robert fly to England to spend time at the Osbournes' other home. Jack shows Robert the house and introduces him to the family's oldest dog, Sugar. Some of Jack's friends also come over to hang out with them and drink. Lola grows lonely and bored because she misses Jack so much. Sharon also laments the departures of both Jack and Kelly, who is away on tour. Meanwhile, Ozzy uncovers an old keyboard from his Black Sabbath days and tries to get it working again. He also becomes fascinated with carrot cake, but Pete tries to stop him from overdoing it. Jack and Kelly return home and are reunited with their loved ones.
30	20	"Ozz Well That Ends All"	August 10, 2003
Kelly experiences problems in her relationship with Bert. He finally breaks up with her over the phone on Valentine's Day, claiming that no one took him seriously because he was dating her. Kelly becomes extremely irritable and depressed, and takes her anger out on the family. She argues with Sharon, who suggests that she find another manager; and bites Jack on the arm. She overhears her family talking about her and decides to leave home. Meanwhile, Jack is alarmed when he acts out violently in his sleep. He wakes up one night to find himself beating up Lola. On another night, he attacks Minnie; and is horrified to wake up and discover that he has killed her. He flees the house with the body. A devastated Sharon retreats to the family's Malibu home to escape memories of Minnie. Ozzy is left all alone, with no one to help him fix the television. Suddenly, the director yells, "Cut!" Ozzy rejoins his family (including Minnie) in another room, and it is revealed that this episode has been scripted. Everyone pretends that the entire series has been fake: Ozzy expresses relief at no longer having to say the f-word, and tells someone to pick up the "fake" dog doo.
