= The Osbournes season 1 =

The Osbournes
- Season 1
- DVD cover
- No. of episodes: 10

Release
- Original network: MTV
- Original release: March 5 – May 7, 2002

Season chronology
- Next → Season 2

The first season of the reality series The Osbournes premiered on MTV on March 5 and concluded on May 7, 2002 with a total of 10 episodes. The series follows the lives of Ozzy Osbourne and his family. This season garnered the show a Primetime Emmy Award for Outstanding Reality Program.

== Episodes ==
| No. overall | No. in season | Title | Original release date |
|---|---|---|---|
| 1 | 1 | "There Goes the Neighborhood" | March 5, 2002 |
The debut episode opens with a brief introduction of the family with a voice-over and scenes of each member. After the introductions, the episode deals with the family moving into their new Beverly Hills home. The family deal with problems that could arise from such a situation - finding valuable furniture broken due to lousy packing and trying to set up the TV with no instructions. Ozzy appears on The Tonight Show with Jay Leno as a performer. Kelly and Sharon come with Ozzy to the show, but Jack stays at home, watching a documentary about marijuana instead. The episode also shows Jack and Kelly's love-hate relationship, and their constant fighting. While the Osbournes are still settling in, Kelly nearly sets the kitchen on fire, and Jack wanders around the background clad in pseudo Army gear in a daze. The two constantly fight, chasing each other around the house. Jack and Kelly then go out clubbing, on Sunset Strip, using fake IDs. Ozzy warns them not to drink or take drugs and to wear condoms if they have sex. In spite of all the problems, Sharon is happy and content that they're finally 'home'.
| 1 | 2 | "Bark at the Moon" | March 12, 2002 |
The episode starts with a brief scene of Ozzy and Sharon trying to turn on their new vacuum cleaner. Kelly lends a hand and switches on the vacuum, and Ozzy complains about the loudness of the vacuum. The family's numerous dogs has been excreting far too many times in the house, and ruining valuable furniture in the process. The worst dog is Lola, a bull dog which belongs to Jack. Lola has already demolished a valuable sofa. Sharon threatens Jack she'll give Lola away. Jack says Lola is demolishing the furniture because Kelly has bought a new cat into the house, and Lola is angry. Kelly gets busted for not stopping at a stop sign while driving, and is not far from having her license taken away. Elijah Wood and his sister Hannah visit the Osbournes. Lola does a massive 'crap' in Ozzy and Sharon's bedroom and urinates on the family sofas. Sharon threatens to give the dog away but later decides to hire a dog trainer. The dog trainer says that the dogs are spoiled rotten and untrained, and briefly trains Lola. As the dog trainer leaves, Lola urinates on a carpet. It is revealed Kelly has bought two cats, and Ozzy sees them. His yell of horror can be heard beyond Beverly Hills...
| 1 | 3 | "For the Record..." | March 19, 2002 |
Ozzy's releases his first solo album in six years. Ozzy and Sharon arrive at a in-store gig. Ozzy sign autographs and takes photos with fans, including an entire squad of security guards. Afterwards, Ozzy and Sharon go to KROQ-FM and have an interview on Loveline. Jack listens to the interview over the radio in a friend's car. Ozzy and Sharon discuss their sex life, and how Ozzy has been using Viagra excessively because he had been 'shooting blanks'. Jack winces in embarrassment as the Osbournes go on to say how Ozzy would get 'hard' at inconvenient times when Sharon is sleeping and not interested. On the day Jack goes to camp, Melinda tries to wake up Jack. But Jack is very depressed for some unknown reason and it becomes a struggle for Melinda to get him up. Jack manages to get to the school bus in time and is off to camp, but Sharon is very worried that Jack may need medication. Afterwards Sharon and Kelly take a private flight to New York to be with Ozzy. Ozzy appears on a TRL show with daughter Kelly, who is told backstage not to swear on stage. Kelly's 17th birthday is coming up and Sharon has arranged a themed party back at home. While going over the development of Kelly's party, Sharon gets a call from Jack's school that Jack is coming back from camp. Jack had been complaining that he didn't like the students, he threw rocks at students and tents and he cursed at the school captain. Morning after her 17th birthday party, Kelly reveals to Ozzy that she has a tattoo on her hip. Sharon is disappointed and says she's a very stupid person. Ozzy finishes the episode saying, with advice about tattoos, that he doesn't want an eagle on his daughter's buttock.
| 4 | 4 | "Won't You Be My Neighbor?" | March 26, 2002 |
Kelly complains that elder sister Aimee had booked her a gynecologist appointment. Ozzy thinks it's a practical joke. The Osbournes have new neighbors, and they had been playing loud European dance music late at night. Sharon confronts them over the fence and tells them to go in their "perfectly big house" to play their music. The neighbors refuse to go inside, and Ozzy declares war. One night the neighbors play camp songs, and Jack finally has enough. He plays Meshuggah on full volume to upset the neighbors. It wakes Kelly who comes running out of the house and throwing tantrums. Next, Jack and Sharon start throwing ham across the fence. This catches the attention of the police, and they tell Sharon they are powerless to do anything about the loud noise UNLESS they are there when it happens. They also warn the family not to throw "the good food" over the fence, and to call them when the neighbors start playing up again. Ozzy, who had been sleeping through all this, awakes and grabs a piece of firewood and throws it over the fence. Even though Sharon insists that he throws the fruit. Something smashes. The cops come back! and they all run into the house.
| 5 | 5 | "Tour of Duty" | April 2, 2002 |
Ozzy is working out with a personal trainer in preparation for an upcoming tour. Sharon talks with a friend over the phone saying that the original name for Ozzy's tour was going to be 'Black Christmas', but was inappropriate because of the 9/11 attacks and its aftermath, so they renamed it 'Merry Mayhem'. Sharon adds that Ozzy will come on stage in a sleigh that will go around the stadium. On a day off, Sharon and Kelly go on a shopping spree at Saks Fifth Avenue, and loses Ozzy's credit card in the process. Panic-stricken, Kelly takes the blame for the missing card and frantically searches her car and finally finds it under the driver's seat - in the middle of the night. The next day, Ozzy goes to band rehearsal for the tour, warning that guitarist Zakk plays louder than Satan. Later, he does a Moulin Rouge skit for more promotional purposes. Ozzy prepares to leave for tour, and Sharon remarks that he finds it very stressful when embarking on a tour. During the rehearsal, Sharon shows to Ozzy all the special effects for the shows. Ozzy is angry by all the special side effects, thinking it will distract the fans from his music. He refuses to perform two nights in a row with the silly special effects. He says Sharon only cares about the money rolling in. Somehow Sharon persuades him to do the two shows anyway, and they become a success.
| 6 | 6 | "Trouble in Paradise" | April 9, 2002 |
Ozzy has well gone into his tour, traveling across the USA. Sharon had returned home and says she'll reunite with Ozzy in Houston because she misses him so much. Kelly complains about her twisted ankle after falling into a hole exactly the same size as her foot. When Sharon and Ozzy reunite in Houston, Ozzy says he had injured his leg during a concert. Back at the house, Jack and nanny Melinda are at each other's throats. Melinda blames Jack's moodiness on him being tired and sticking to a busy schedule, which is hardly true. Jack parties out late, orders pizza in early morning, sleeps in, and plays games. Melinda calls Ozzy and Sharon and says that Jack has left the house and hasn't returned for hours. She's worried that Jack might be dead out there. Ozzy contacts Jack on his mobile. He tells Jack it's no such big deal to apologize to Melinda for being bratty. Jack refuses to apologize anyway, not wanting to appear sensitive and mushy. Ozzy eventually returns home and despite a broken leg, he has to fetch the cat which walks around the dangerous unfinished pool. He wanders about trying to get the cat until Sharon finally assists him and gets the cat. Both Sharon and Ozzy become fed up with Jack and Kelly constantly partying and bringing friends over at noon. They order a family meeting and give a stern talking to Kelly and Jack, despite concerns that Kelly would cause problems, it is Jack that becomes outraged and leaves the meeting failing to improve while Kelly decides to change.
| 7 | 7 | "Get Stuffed" | April 16, 2002 |
Ozzy mixes alcohol with the pain medication for his foot injury and winds up stoned. He tries to take Lola for a walk, but Sharon sends Jack to retrieve him. The Osbournes suffer through a miserable Thanksgiving. Ozzy works on the video for his song "Dreamer," and adamantly refuses to wear a bat coat. Kelly grows frustrated when the media continually mentions Jack's work with Epic Records, as she feels they are implying that she isn't doing anything with her life. She angrily insists that she actually discovered the band that Jack is helping, and that he hasn't given her any credit. She turns to Ozzy for sympathy, but he isn't quite sure what he wants her to say. Ozzy grows fed up with the family and insists on returning to the tour alone. Sharon, Jack and Kelly decide to surprise him in Chicago for his birthday. They hide from him until his birthday because they fear he would become angry if he saw them before his birthday dinner. When the event finally arrives, Ozzy is surprised and pleased to see his family.
| 8 | 8 | "No Vagrancy" | April 23, 2002 |
Jack invites his friend Jason Dill, a professional skateboarder, to stay at the house after he is kicked out of the home of yet another of his friends. Ozzy and Sharon are more than a little put off by the fact that Jack just lets Dill come over without telling them, let alone asking for permission. Dill is obnoxious and slovenly, and creeps out Ozzy and others with his habit of always scratching his head. Dill also smokes and drinks a lot, and Sharon is annoyed to find a bottle of Jack Daniels with his belongings. She decides that she is going to urinate in the bottle, but Kelly pleads with her not to do this. Dill accidentally starts a fire in the kitchen, doing damage to a pan and the stove top. Jack is irritated by the fact that Dill is the only one who doesn't seem to be helping clean up the mess, although Dill points out that he would only make things worse. Ozzy and Sharon finally persuade Jack to ask Dill to leave the house. Jack is upset when Sharon and Ozzy give away Lola because she keeps leaving horrific messes around the house. Jack tries to make arrangements to spend time with the dog on weekends, but Ozzy finally agrees to let Lola come back to the house, provided that Jack looks after her.
| 9 | 9 | "A Very Ozzy Christmas" | April 30, 2002 |
The Osbournes are packing their stuff at the Peninsula Hotel in New York, and Sharon tells Ozzy and Jack that one of their tour truck drivers had an accident the other day. He was getting a blow job from a hooker he had picked up, and was driving in the nude. Later they are on a tour bus driving around New York, and Sharon is informed that Michael, their security guard, had been arrested for robbing a house behind theirs. Ozzy immediately suspects that Michael may have stolen his jewelry. Ozzy embarks on his last promotional concert for his new album in New York. Back at the hotel, Ozzy is flabbergasted when he sees all the designer branded shopping bags Sharon has. Ozzy, Sharon and Jack return home, managing to get all the bags onto the plane. When Christmas finally arrives, presents are exchanged, and the Osbournes are paid a visit by Ozzy's son from his first marriage, techno DJ Louis Osbourne. For dinner, Ozzy repeats: "We did really great with that gravy!" and Sharon sighs: "We're gonna hear about this fucking gravy for the next year". Ozzy opens a champagne bottle, and almost breaks something when the cork flies across the room. Sharon starts talking about Christina Aguilera's album 'My Kind Of Christmas'. Jack flips Kelly the finger for no reason. Kelly pouts, gets up and leaves the dining room. After the dinner, Jack's and Kelly's girl friends, come over for a visit and talk with the Osbournes in the sitting room. Jack gets a pocket knife from one of his friends for Christmas. He plans to go out with it, but Sharon and Ozzy warns if he goes out with an army-style haircut, a tee with 'Cocaine' on it and holding a pocket knife, he would get arrested by the police. The day after Christmas, Sharon and Kelly meet up with Michael, their security guard. Michael explains how he had never been in the house behind theirs and never took anything.
| 10 | 10 | "Dinner with Ozzy" | TBA |
The episode starts with Ozzy sitting in his dining room and enjoying dinner and recounts a time when a stray cat entered their house. Note we actually hear and see Aimee (Whose face is blurred due to her not wanting to participate in the show) in this segment. Ozzy then introduces and discusses Sharon, and there scenes of her giving him a breath strip. The next scene shows Sharon kissing and snuggling Ozzy while Jack tries to watch TV. Then, Ozzy talks to Kelly and Melinda about being put in jail for stealing. Ozzy then starts to talk about Jack. Jack is then shown walking around with a rifle and wearing army gear. Kelly then complains that "15 year old boys shouldn't be playing with rifles and knives" She then brings up an old situation that Jack had shot Kelly with a pellet gun six year earlier and she still has a grudge. Ozzy then briefly talks on how much Kelly and Jack fight but that they should outgrow it. The next scene though comes up and it's revealed that Jack hasn't gotten up to go to school. Ozzy walks into Jack's room, wakes him up, and tells him that he needs to go to school. Ozzy then talks about Sharon not liking cooking. This brings up a scene with Kelly complaining to her mom that she doesn't cook. Ozzy then says that the first thing that attracted him to Sharon was her laugh. Then a scene is shown with Sharon and Kelly talking about their chests. Ozzy then comes back and says that Kelly doesn't take after her mom and she definitely doesn't take after Ozzy. Ozzy comes back again and says that people think he lives in a Bavarian castle like a bat, but he does chores like everyone else. He is then shown grinding coffee, collecting firewood, and making microwave popcorn. Then Ozzy says that sometimes he feels invisible. Ozzy then finishes his dinner with a cup of tea and a montage of scenes from the season is shown. Ozzy then says, "That's the way we are. We're The Osbournes. I love it."
