= Bararite =

Halide mineral

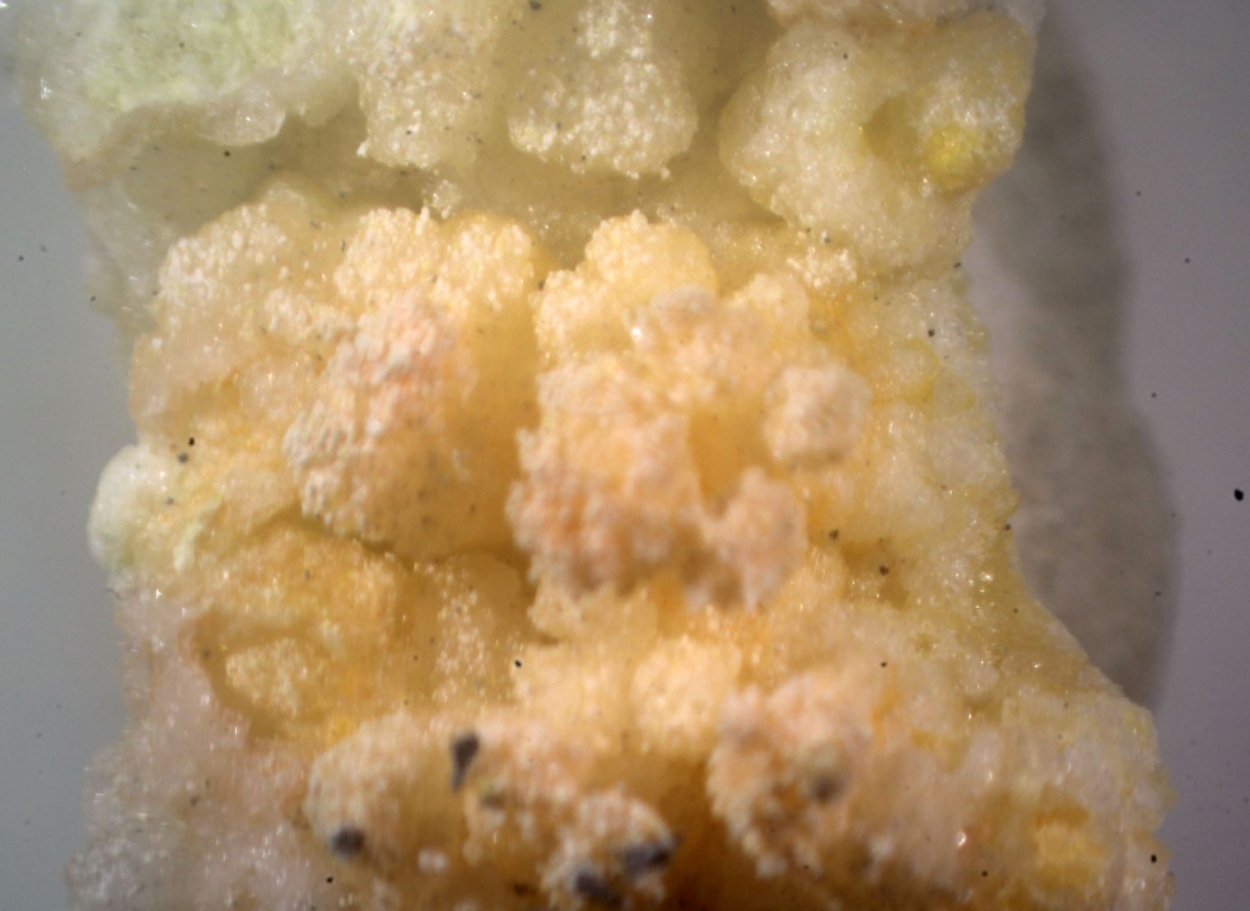
- Pale pink yellowish crystals of bararite from Shamokin, Northumberland County, Pennsylvania, USA

General
- Category: Halide mineral
- Formula: (NH_{4})_{2}SiF_{6}
- IMA symbol: Brr
- Strunz classification: 3.CH.10
- Crystal system: Trigonal
- Crystal class: Hexagonal scalenohedral (3̅m); H-M symbol: (3̅ 2/m)
- Space group: P3̅m1
- Unit cell: a = 5.77 Å, c = 4.78 Å; Z = 1

Identification
- Color: White to colorless
- Crystal habit: Tabular, sometimes elongated on {0001}, also appears in irregularly shaped or mammillary surfaces that comprise mainly cryptohalite
- Twinning: Interpenetration twins (paddlewheels/darts), axis parallel to {0001}
- Cleavage: [0001] perfect
- Mohs scale hardness: 2.5
- Luster: Vitreous
- Diaphaneity: Transparent
- Specific gravity: 2.152 (synthetic)
- Optical properties: Uniaxial (-)
- Refractive index: n_{ω} = 1.406 ± 0.001, n_{ε} = 1.391 ± 0.003
- Birefringence: 0.015 ± 0.003
- Solubility: Dissolves in water
- Other characteristics: salty taste

Bararite is a natural form of ammonium fluorosilicate (also known as hexafluorosilicate or fluosilicate). It has chemical formula (NH_{4})_{2}SiF_{6} and trigonal crystal structure. This mineral was once classified as part of cryptohalite. Bararite is named after the place where it was first described, Barari in Jharia Coal Field, Dhanbad, India. It is found at the fumaroles of volcanoes (Vesuvius, Italy), over burning coal seams (Barari, India), and in burning piles of anthracite (Pennsylvania, U.S.). It is a sublimation product that forms with cryptohalite, sal ammoniac, and native sulfur.

== History ==
A. Scacchi first discovered cryptohalite in 1873. It appeared in a volcanic sublimate from the Vesuvian eruption of 1850. In 1926, W.A.K. Christie reported his own chemical study. A microscope was used to pick out enough material for analysis. Distilling with sodium hydroxide (NaOH) produced ammonia (NH_{3}). The anions of hexafluorosilicic acid (H_{2}SiF_{6}) precipitated as potassium fluorosilicate (K_{2}SiF_{6}). Barium sulfate (BaSO_{4}) was thrown into the filtrate, and then calcium fluoride (CaF_{2}). Christie found 20.43% (NH_{4})^{+} and 78.87% (SiF_{6})^{2−}.

Bararite is named after Barari, a locality in India. This was where the species was first completely described. Earlier, bararite was recognized as part of mixtures with cryptohalite. However, it did not receive its own name until 1951. The East Indian Coal Company provided the sample that Christie used to evaluate bararite.

Bararite has not received a quantitative chemical analysis in its natural form. Christie received far too little for more than qualitative analysis through microchemistry. He utilized F. Emich's methods with capillary tube centrifuges.

== Structure ==
Bararite is the beta, trigonal (scalenohedral) form of ammonium hexafluorosilicate. Its symmetry is 3̅2/m. The space group is P3̅m1. The a-axes in the unit cell are 5.784 ± 0.005 Å (angstroms), and the c-axis is 4.796 ± 0.006 Å. The unit lattice is primitive. (Note: Data for the space group come from synthetic crystals.) Cryptohalite has the cubic (isometric) crystal structure and corresponds to the alpha form. Both minerals have the chemical formula (NH_{4})_{2}SiF_{6}. The halides of form A_{m}BX_{6} fall into two groups: hieratite and malladrite. The hieratite group is isometric whereas the malladrite is hexagonal.

The (SiF_{6})^{2−} is octahedral—one fluorine atom at each vertex. In bararite, the (NH_{4})^{+}’s are trigonally coordinated. They all appear at sites of C_{3v} (3m) symmetry. The (NH_{4})^{+} has 12 fluorine neighbors, which form four triangles. Three of these triangles are isosceles. These triangles themselves form a triangle—around the 3-fold axis containing the nitrogen atom. One triangle is equilateral. Its symmetry axis is the same axis that goes through the nitrogen atom. (For structural diagrams, see link to unit cell and downloadable articles in “References.”)

The silicon atoms of cryptohalite, α-(NH_{4})_{2}SiF_{6} (alpha), have cubic close(st) packing (CCP). A third form (gamma, γ) of (NH_{4})_{2}SiF_{6} uses hexagonal close(st) packing (HCP). Bararite, β-(NH_{4})_{2}SiF_{6}, utilizes hexagonal primitive (HP) packing. Layers with distorted octahedral gaps separate those with the anions. The (NH_{4})^{+} ions appear a little below and above the (SiF_{6})^{2−}. In all three phases, 12 fluorine atoms neighbor the (NH_{4})^{+}. Distances range from about 3.0 to 3.2 Å. The (NH_{4})^{+} has no free rotation. It only librates (oscillates)—at least when vibrationally excited.

As a salt, bararite is an ionic compound. The ions, of course, have ionic bonding. The atoms of polyatomic ions are held together covalently. The orientation of (NH_{4})^{+} is sustained by four trifurcated (three-branch) hydrogen bonds. These bonds point toward the triangles containing the 12 fluorine neighbors. Three H bonds are equivalent. The fourth bond, pointing toward the equilateral triangle, has a shorter distance.

The intermolecular distances between fluorine atoms are smaller in bararite (3.19 and 3.37 Å) than cryptohalite. In cryptohalite, each anion is coordinated to 12 others. Bararite has (2+6)-fold coordination. The two Si-Si distances between layers (4.796 ± 0.006 Å) do not equal the six within a layer (5.784 ± 0.005 Å). Bararite is more compressible along the c-axis than the a-axis.

Bararite has no known solution or exsolution, but it is always mixed with other substances (cryptohalite, sal ammoniac, and sulfur). Due to thermal motion, atomic behavior of ammonium salts can be very hard to evaluate. The anions, however, are ordered and have no unusual motion from heat.

A third form of (NH_{4})_{2}SiF_{6} was discovered in 2001 and identified with the 6mm symmetry (hexagonal). In all three arrangements, the (SiF_{6})^{2−} octahedra come in layers. In the cubic form (cryptohalite), these layers are perpendicular to [111]. In the trigonal (bararite) and hexagonal (gamma, γ) forms, the layers are perpendicular to the c-axis. (Note: Trigonal crystals are part of the hexagonal group. But not all hexagonal crystals are trigonal.)

Although bararite was claimed to be metastable at room temperature, it does not appear one polymorph has ever turned into another. Still, bararite is fragile enough that grinding it for spectroscopy will produce a little cryptohalite. Even so, ammonium fluorosilicate assumes a trigonal form at pressures of 0.2 to 0.3 giga-pascals (GPa). The reaction is irreversible. If this phase is not bararite, it is at least very closely related.

The hydrogen bonding in (NH_{4})_{2}SiF_{6} allows this salt to change phases in ways that normal salts cannot. Interactions between cations and anions are especially important in how ammonium salts change phase.

== Physical properties ==
Bararite forms tabular crystals. They are flattened, sometimes elongated, on {0001} (perpendicular to c). Christie reported tiny, transparent crystals of bararite that looked like paddlewheels and darts. Each had four barbs at 90°. The crystals reached up to 1 mm long, the barbs up to 0.2 mm wide. They were interpenetration twins, the twin axis perpendicular to the c-axis. Visually, cryptohalite crystals are almost impossible to discern from sal ammoniac (NH_{4}Cl). Inclusions of bararite in cryptohalite can be seen only with plane-polarized light.

Bararite has perfect cleavage on the {0001} plane. The hardness is probably 2 1/2. The anions (as already shown) are bonded much more strongly within layers than between layers. Also, ionic bonds are not the strongest bonds, and halides cannot normally scratch glass plates.

Bararite has a measured density of 2.152 g/mL (synthetic)—but a calculated density of 2.144 g/mL. It tastes salty, and it dissolves in water. Its luster is vitreous (like glass). Bararite is white to colorless. These properties are similar to halite (NaCl)—which gave the halide group its name.

Whereas cryptohalite belongs to the isotropic optical class, bararite is uniaxial negative. At 1.391 ± 0.003, the refractive index through c is smaller than through a (1.406 ± 0.001). The c-axis in bararite is shorter than the a-axes (see “Structure”). Furthermore, only this path lets light hit nothing but the same ion in the same orientation (all the layers have the same structure and orientation).

Bararite has about a 6% greater density than cryptohalite. As discussed before, its structure is more packed. This substance can be produced easily from aqueous solution, but only below 5 °C (41 °F) will pure bararite form. Above 13 °C (55 °F), almost pure cryptohalite emerges. Bararite sublimes without leaving residue.

== Geologic occurrence ==
In nature, bararite appears with cryptohalite, sal ammoniac, and native sulfur. It is found over a burning coal seam in Barari, India, and as a sublimation product in Vesuvius, Italy, at fumaroles (opening in or near a volcano where hot sulfurous gases come out). It also is found in the United States, in Pennsylvania. It appears in burning piles of anthracite (highest grade of coal)—again as a sublimation product.

Christie found translucent arborescent (treelike) crystals, with vitreous luster. He found white, opaque lumps that were a mixture of (NH_{4})_{2}SiF_{6} with SiO_{2}. They were irregularly shaped but usually had a mammillary surface (several convex surfaces smoothly rounded). These hold primarily cryptohalite but also some bararite. In Pennsylvania, bararite normally comes as tiny inclusions in cryptohalite crystals. It appears that first, bararite forms through direct sublimation. Afterward, it quickly changes to cryptohalite.

In Barari, burning-coal gases go through a dike (igneous intrusion) of mica and peridotite. The sulfur dioxide must attack apatite in the dike, which produces hydrofluoric acid that attacks the abundant silicates. Silicon fluoride is formed. Ammonia also comes from burning coal. From there, ammonium fluorosilicate can form. A slight excess of ammonia could lead to the white lumps of silica and cryptohalite. Bararite and cryptohalite in their pure forms, for the most part, grow out of these nodules. Recrystallization from the rain is probably responsible.

Fluorosilicate minerals are thermodynamically unstable in soil. Still, intense heat promotes the formation of (NH_{4})_{2}SiF_{6} to some degree—as seen in some experiments by Rehim. But this compound will break up at 320 to 335 °C. Both burning coal and volcanoes are important sources of SO_{2} and SiF_{4}.

== Chemical properties and uses ==
Fluorosilicic acid and its salts are poisonous. Ammonium fluorosilicate, however, is very rare in nature and apparently much easier to synthesize.
