= Lithium hexafluorosilicate =

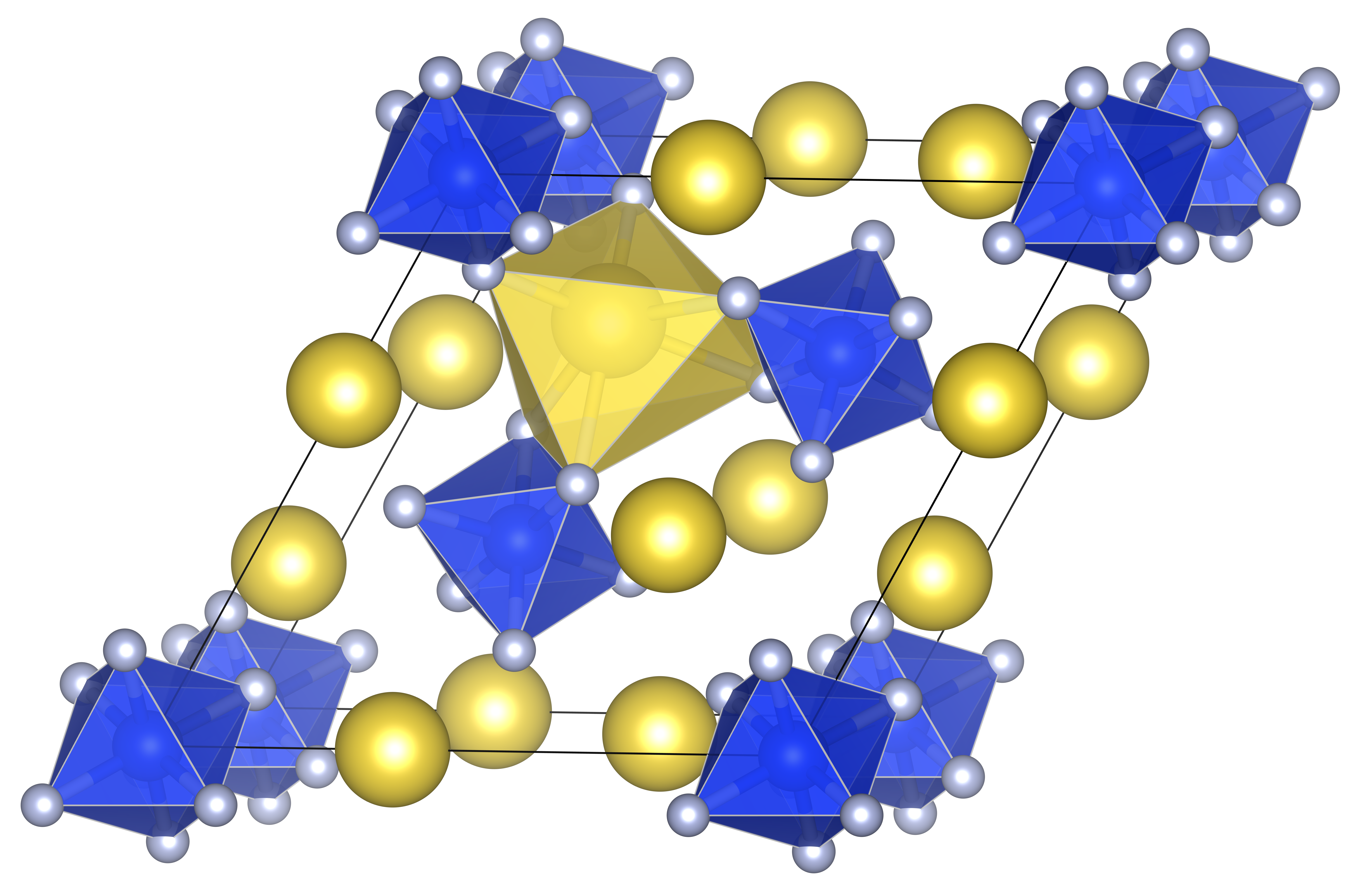

Names
- IUPAC name dilithium; hexafluorosilicon(2-)
- Other names Dilithium hexafluorosilicate

Identifiers
CAS Number	17347-95-4
3D model (JSmol)	Interactive image
ChemSpider	11254702
ECHA InfoCard	100.037.595
EC Number	241-372-6
PubChem CID	13629069
- InChI: InChI=1S/F6Si.2Li/c1-7(2,3,4,5)6;;/q-2;2*+1 Key: QSDQCOGGZWIADS-UHFFFAOYSA-N
- SMILES: [Li+].[Li+].F[Si-2](F)(F)(F)(F)F

Properties
Chemical formula	F_{6}Li_{2}Si
Molar mass	155.96 g·mol^{−1}
Appearance	White powder
Density	2.33 g/cm^{3}
Solubility in water	soluble

Hazards
- GHS labelling
Pictograms	(GHS07: Exclamation mark)
Signal word	Warning
Hazard statements	H302
- Except where otherwise noted, data are given for materials in their standard state (at 25 °C [77 °F], 100 kPa). Infobox references

Lithium hexafluorosilicate is an inorganic chemical compound with the chemical formula Li_{2}SiF_{6}.

== Synthesis ==
Lithium hexafluorosilicate can be obtained by reacting hexafluorosilicic acid with lithium hydroxide or lithium carbonate or by reacting silicon tetrafluoride with lithium fluoride.

H_{2}[SiF_{6}] + 2LiOH → Li_{2}[SiF_{6}] + 2H_{2}O

== Physical properties ==
Lithium hexafluorosilicate is a white, odorless solid that is soluble in water and methanol. When heated above 250 °C, it decomposes into lithium fluoride and silicon(IV) fluoride. It has a trigonal crystal structure with the space group P 321 (space group no. 150) and three formula units per unit cell, isotypic to sodium hexafluorosilicate.

== Uses ==
Lithium hexafluorosilicate is used as an intermediate in the manufacture of pharmaceuticals and other chemical compounds. It is also an intermediate in the preparation of lithium chloride from lithium-containing minerals by reacting with hexafluorosilicic acid.
