= Silicon =

Silicon, _{14}Si
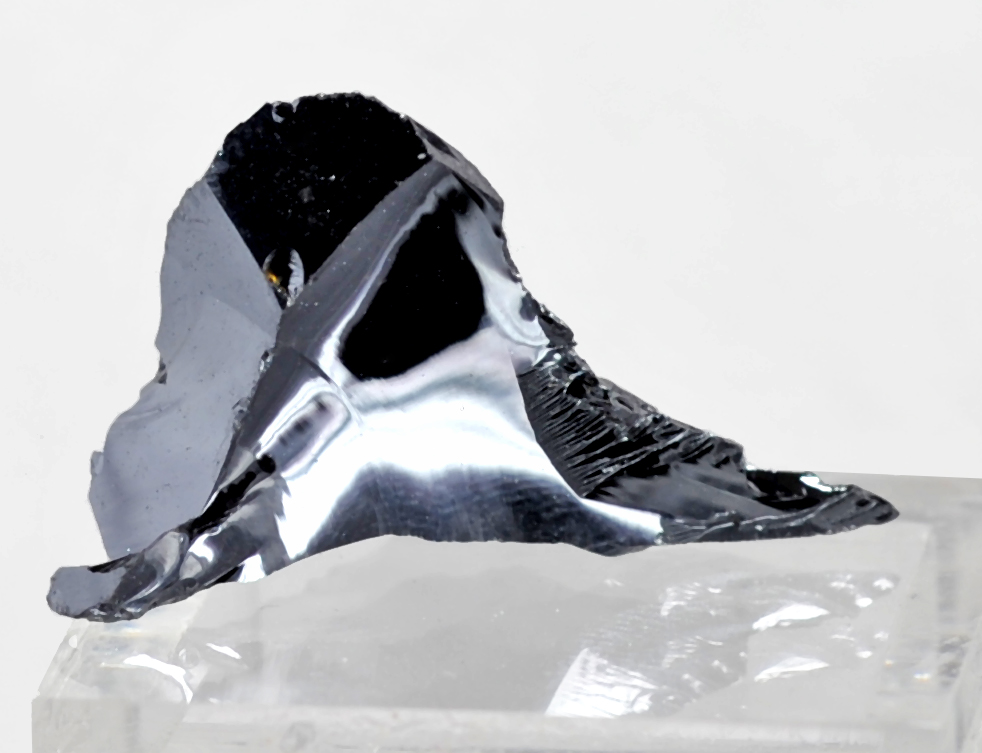

Silicon
- Pronunciation: /ˈsɪləkən/ (SIL-ə-kən); /ˈsɪləkɒn/ (SIL-ə-kon)
- Allotropes: see Allotropes of silicon
- Appearance: crystalline, reflective with bluish-tinged faces

Standard atomic weight A_{r}°(Si)
- [28.084, 28.086]; 28.085±0.001 (abridged)

Silicon in the periodic table
Hydrogen																															Helium
Lithium	Beryllium																									Boron	Carbon	Nitrogen	Oxygen	Fluorine	Neon
Sodium	Magnesium																									Aluminium	Silicon	Phosphorus	Sulfur	Chlorine	Argon
Potassium	Calcium															Scandium	Titanium	Vanadium	Chromium	Manganese	Iron	Cobalt	Nickel	Copper	Zinc	Gallium	Germanium	Arsenic	Selenium	Bromine	Krypton
Rubidium	Strontium															Yttrium	Zirconium	Niobium	Molybdenum	Technetium	Ruthenium	Rhodium	Palladium	Silver	Cadmium	Indium	Tin	Antimony	Tellurium	Iodine	Xenon
Caesium	Barium	Lanthanum	Cerium	Praseodymium	Neodymium	Promethium	Samarium	Europium	Gadolinium	Terbium	Dysprosium	Holmium	Erbium	Thulium	Ytterbium	Lutetium	Hafnium	Tantalum	Tungsten	Rhenium	Osmium	Iridium	Platinum	Gold	Mercury (element)	Thallium	Lead	Bismuth	Polonium	Astatine	Radon
Francium	Radium	Actinium	Thorium	Protactinium	Uranium	Neptunium	Plutonium	Americium	Curium	Berkelium	Californium	Einsteinium	Fermium	Mendelevium	Nobelium	Lawrencium	Rutherfordium	Dubnium	Seaborgium	Bohrium	Hassium	Meitnerium	Darmstadtium	Roentgenium	Copernicium	Nihonium	Flerovium	Moscovium	Livermorium	Tennessine	Oganesson
C
↑
Si
↓
Ge
aluminium ← silicon → phosphorus
- Atomic number (Z): 14
- Group: group 14 (carbon group)
- Period: period 3
- Block: p-block
- Electron configuration: [Ne] 3s^{2} 3p^{2}
- Electrons per shell: 2, 8, 4

Physical properties
- Phase at STP: solid
- Melting point: 1687 K (1414 °C, 2577 °F)
- Boiling point: 3538 K (3265 °C, 5909 °F)
- Density (at 20° C): 2.329085 g/cm^{3}
- when liquid (at m.p.): 2.57 g/cm^{3}
- Heat of fusion: 50.21 kJ/mol
- Heat of vaporization: 383 kJ/mol
- Molar heat capacity: 19.789 J/(mol·K)
- Specific heat capacity: 704.611 J/(kg·K)
Vapor pressure
P (Pa)	1	10	100	1 k	10 k	100 k
at T (K)	1908	2102	2339	2636	3021	3537

Atomic properties
- Oxidation states: common: −4, +4 −3, −2, −1, 0, +1, +2, +3
- Electronegativity: Pauling scale: 1.90
- Ionization energies: 1st: 786.5 kJ/mol; 2nd: 1577.1 kJ/mol; 3rd: 3231.6 kJ/mol; (more)
- Atomic radius: empirical: 111 pm
- Covalent radius: 111 pm
- Van der Waals radius: 210 pm
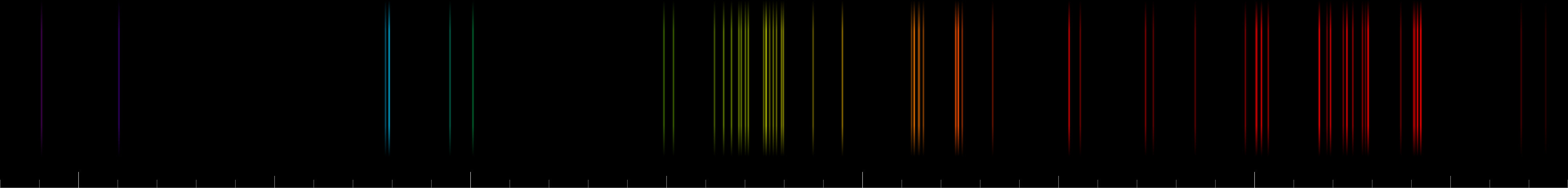
- Spectral lines of silicon

Other properties
- Natural occurrence: primordial
- Crystal structure: face-centered diamond-cubic (cF8)
- Lattice constant: a = 543.0986 pm (at 20 °C)
- Thermal expansion: 2.556×10^{−6}/K (at 20 °C)
- Thermal conductivity: 149 W/(m⋅K)
- Electrical resistivity: 2.3×10^{3} Ω⋅m (at 20 °C)
- Band gap: 1.12 eV (at 300 K)
- Magnetic ordering: diamagnetic
- Molar magnetic susceptibility: −3.9×10^{−6} cm^{3}/mol (298 K)
- Young's modulus: 130–188 GPa
- Shear modulus: 51–80 GPa
- Bulk modulus: 97.6 GPa
- Speed of sound thin rod: 8433 m/s (at 20 °C)
- Poisson ratio: 0.064–0.28
- Mohs hardness: 6.5
- CAS Number: 7440-21-3

History
- Naming: after Latin silex or silicis, meaning 'flint'
- Prediction: Antoine Lavoisier (1787)
- Discovery and first isolation: Jöns Jacob Berzelius (1823)
- Named by: Thomas Thomson (1817)

Isotopes of silicon
Main isotopes			Decay	
Isotope	abundance	half-life (t_{1/2})	mode	product
^{28}Si	92.24%	stable		
^{29}Si	4.67%	stable		
^{30}Si	3.07%	stable		
^{31}Si	(unstable)	2.62 h	β^{−}	^{31}P
^{32}Si	(unstable)	157 y	β^{−}	^{32}P

Silicon (/ˈsɪl.ɪ.kən/, SILL-ih-kən) is a chemical element; it has symbol Si and atomic number 14. It is a hard, brittle crystalline solid with a blue-grey metallic lustre, and is a tetravalent non-metal (sometimes considered as a metalloid) and semiconductor. It is a member of group 14 in the periodic table: carbon is above it; and germanium, tin, lead, and flerovium are below it. It is relatively unreactive. Silicon is a significant element that is essential for several physiological and metabolic processes in plants. Silicon is widely used as a semiconductor material in various electrical devices such as transistors, solar cells, and integrated circuits. It dominates semiconductor applications due to its low cost, excellent electronic properties, and adaptable physical characteristics.

Because of its high chemical affinity for oxygen, it was not until 1823 that Jöns Jakob Berzelius was first able to prepare it and characterize it in pure form. Its oxides form a family of anions known as silicates. Its melting and boiling points of 1414 °C and 3265 °C, respectively, are the second highest among all the metalloids and nonmetals, being surpassed only by boron.

Silicon is the eighth most common element in the universe by mass, but very rarely occurs in its pure form in the Earth's crust. It is widely distributed throughout space in cosmic dusts, planetoids, and planets as various forms of silicon dioxide (silica) or silicates. More than 90% of the Earth's crust is composed of silicate minerals, making silicon the second most abundant element in the Earth's crust (about 28% by mass), after oxygen.

Most silicon is used commercially without being separated, often with very little processing of the natural minerals. Such use includes industrial construction with clays, silica sand, and stone. Silicates are used in Portland cement for mortar and stucco, and mixed with silica sand and gravel to make concrete for walkways, foundations, and roads. They are also used in whiteware ceramics such as porcelain, and in traditional silicate-based soda–lime glass and many other specialty glasses. Silicon compounds such as silicon carbide are used as abrasives and components of high-strength ceramics. Silicon is the basis of the widely used synthetic polymers called silicones.

The late 20th century to early 21st century has been described as the Silicon Age (also known as the Digital Age or Information Age) because of the large impact that elemental silicon has on the modern world economy. The small portion of very highly purified elemental silicon used in semiconductor electronics (<15%) is essential to the transistors and integrated circuit chips used in most modern technology such as smartphones and other computers. In 2019, 32.4% of the semiconductor market segment was for networks and communications devices, and the semiconductors industry is projected to reach $726.73 billion by 2027.

Silicon is an essential element in biology. Only traces are required by most animals, but some sea sponges and microorganisms, such as diatoms and radiolaria, secrete skeletal structures made of silica. Silica is deposited in many plant tissues.

== History ==
Owing to the abundance of silicon in the Earth's crust, natural silicon-based materials have been used for thousands of years. Silicon rock crystals were familiar to various ancient civilizations, such as the predynastic Egyptians who used them for beads and small vases, as well as the ancient Chinese. Glass containing silica was manufactured by the Egyptians since at least 1500 BC, as well as by the ancient Phoenicians. Natural silicate compounds were also used in various types of mortar for construction of early human dwellings.

=== Discovery ===
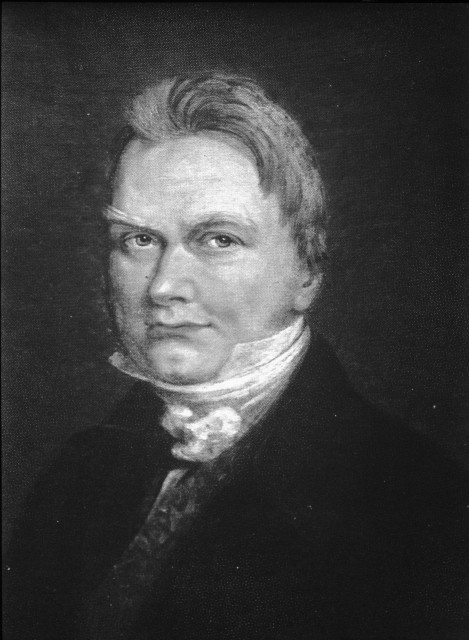
Jöns Jacob Berzelius discovered silicon in 1823.

In 1787, Antoine Lavoisier suspected that silica might be an oxide of a fundamental chemical element, but the chemical affinity of silicon for oxygen is high enough that he had no means to reduce the oxide and isolate the element. After an attempt to isolate silicon in 1808, Sir Humphry Davy proposed the name "silicium" for silicon, from the Latin silex, silicis for flint, and adding the "-ium" ending because he believed it to be a metal. Most other languages use transliterated forms of Davy's name, sometimes adapted to local phonology (e.g. German Silizium, Turkish silisyum, Catalan silici, Armenian Սիլիցիում or Silitzioum). A few others instead use a calque of the Latin root (e.g. Russian кремний, from кремень "flint"; Greek πυρίτιο from πυρ "fire"; Finnish pii from piikivi "flint", Czech křemík from křemen "quartz", "flint").

Gay-Lussac and Thénard are thought to have prepared impure amorphous silicon in 1811, through the heating of recently isolated potassium metal with silicon tetrafluoride, but they did not purify and characterize the product, nor identify it as a new element. Silicon was given its present name in 1817 by Scottish chemist Thomas Thomson. He retained part of Davy's name but added "-on" because he believed that silicon was a nonmetal similar to boron and carbon. In 1824, Jöns Jacob Berzelius prepared amorphous silicon using approximately the same method as Gay-Lussac (reducing potassium fluorosilicate with molten potassium metal), but purifying the product to a brown powder by repeatedly washing it. As a result, he is usually given credit for the element's discovery. The same year, Berzelius became the first to prepare silicon tetrachloride (SiCl_{4}); silicon tetrafluoride had already been prepared long before in 1771 by Carl Wilhelm Scheele by dissolving silica in hydrofluoric acid. In 1846, J. Von Ebelman synthesized tetraethyl orthosilicate (Si(OC_{2}H_{5})_{4}).

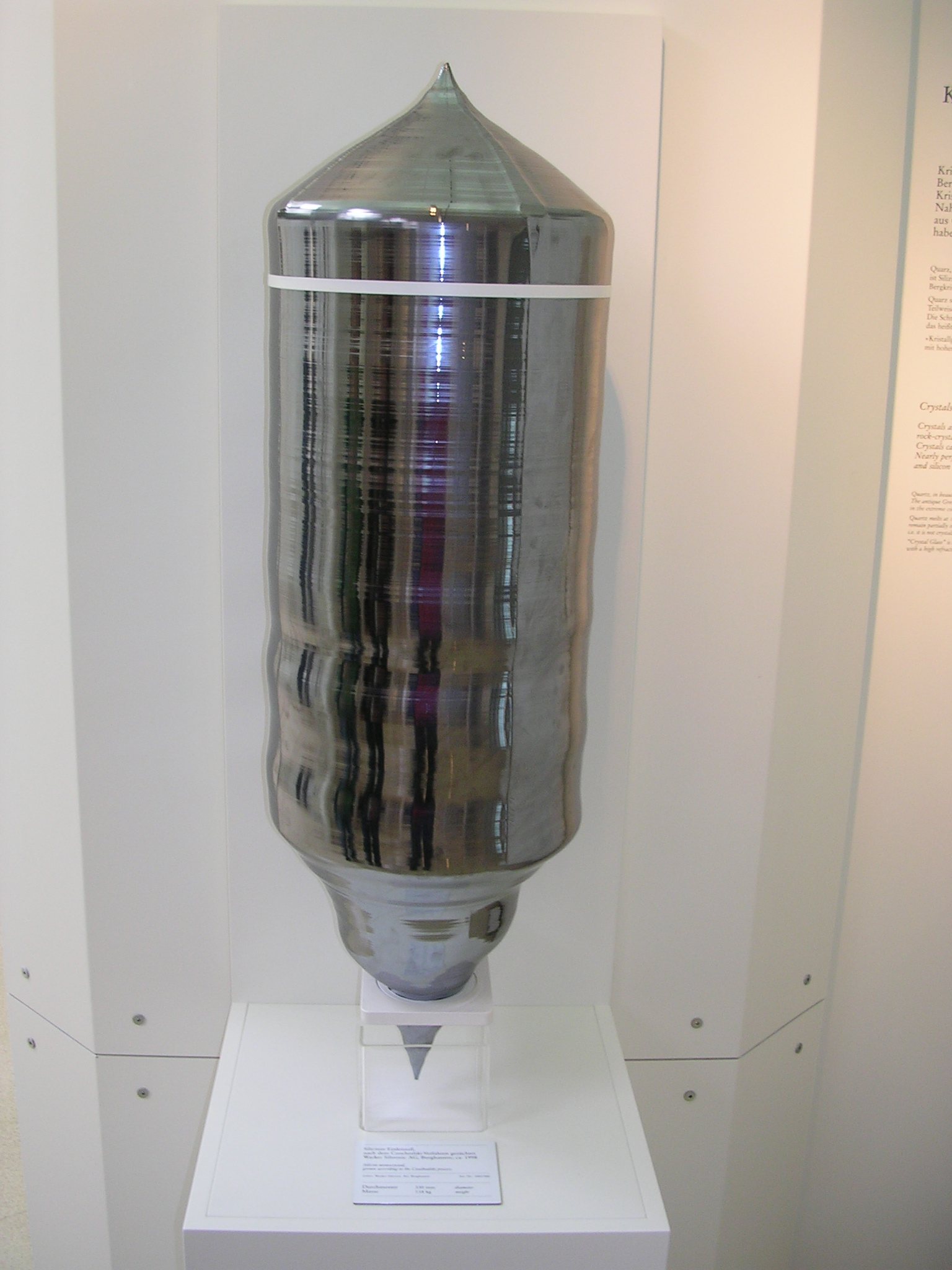
Single crystal of silicon grown by the Czochralski process used to make integrated circuits

Silicon in its more common crystalline form was not prepared until 31 years later, by Deville. Passing silicon chloride vapors over pure aluminum produced pure, hard octahedral crystals. Friedrich Wöhler discovered the first volatile hydrides of silicon, synthesising trichlorosilane in 1857 and silane itself in 1858, but a detailed investigation of the silanes was only carried out in the early 20th century by Alfred Stock, despite early speculation on the matter dating as far back as the beginnings of synthetic organic chemistry in the 1830s. Similarly, the first organosilicon compound, tetraethylsilane, was synthesised by Charles Friedel and James Crafts in 1863, but detailed characterisation of organosilicon chemistry was only done in the early 20th century by Frederic Kipping.

Starting in the 1920s, the work of William Lawrence Bragg on X-ray crystallography elucidated the compositions of the silicates, which had previously been known from analytical chemistry but had not yet been understood, together with Linus Pauling's development of crystal chemistry and Victor Goldschmidt's development of geochemistry. The middle of the 20th century saw the development of the chemistry and industrial use of siloxanes and the growing use of silicone polymers, elastomers, and resins. In the late 20th century, the complexity of the crystal chemistry of silicides was mapped, along with the solid-state physics of doped semiconductors.

=== Silicon semiconductors ===
The first semiconductor devices did not use silicon, but used galena, including German physicist Ferdinand Braun's crystal detector in 1874 and Indian physicist Jagadish Chandra Bose's radio crystal detector in 1901. The first silicon semiconductor device was a silicon radio crystal detector, developed by American engineer Greenleaf Whittier Pickard in 1906.

In 1940, Russell Ohl discovered the p–n junction and photovoltaic effects in silicon. In 1941, techniques for producing high-purity germanium and silicon crystals were developed for radar microwave detector crystals during World War II. In 1947, physicist William Shockley theorized a field-effect amplifier made from germanium and silicon, but he failed to build a working device, before eventually working with germanium instead. The first working transistor was a point-contact transistor built by John Bardeen and Walter Brattain later that year while working under Shockley. In 1954, physical chemist Morris Tanenbaum fabricated the first silicon junction transistor at Bell Labs. In 1955, Carl Frosch and Lincoln Derick at Bell Labs accidentally discovered that silicon dioxide (SiO_{2}) could be grown on silicon. By 1957 Frosch and Derick published their work on the first manufactured SiO_{2} semiconductor oxide transistor: the first planar transistors, in which drain and source were adjacent at the same surface. In 1959, Robert Noyce developed the first silicon-based integrated circuit at Fairchild Semiconductor, building on prior work by Jack Kilby that relied on germanium as the semiconductor.

=== Silicon Age ===
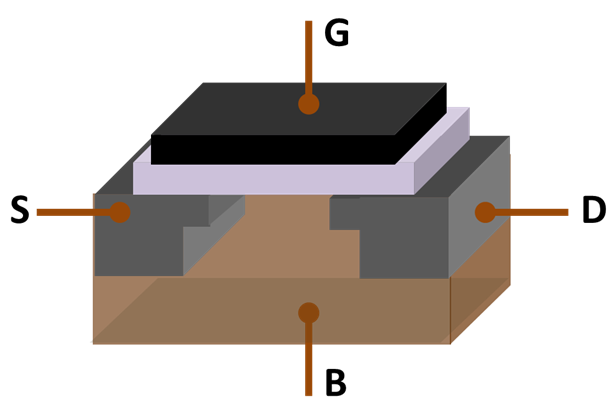
The MOSFET, also known as the MOS transistor, is the key component of the Silicon Age. The first silicon semiconductor oxide planar transistor was made by Frosch and Derick in 1957.

The "Silicon Age" refers to the late 20th century to early 21st century. This is due to silicon being the dominant material used in electronics and information technology (also known as the Digital Age or Information Age), similar to how the Stone Age, Bronze Age and Iron Age were defined by the dominant materials during their respective ages of civilization.

Because silicon is an important element in high-technology semiconductor devices, many places in the world bear its name. For example, the Santa Clara Valley in California acquired the nickname Silicon Valley, as the element is the base material in the semiconductor industry there. Since then, many other places have been similarly dubbed, including Silicon Wadi in Israel; Silicon Forest in Oregon; Silicon Hills in Austin, Texas; Silicon Slopes in Salt Lake City, Utah; Silicon Saxony in Germany; Silicon Valley in India; Silicon Border in Mexicali, Mexico; Silicon Fen in Cambridge, England; Silicon Roundabout in London; Silicon Glen in Scotland; Silicon Gorge in Bristol, England; Silicon Alley in New York City; Silicon Beach in Los Angeles; and Dubai Silicon Oasis in Dubai.

== Characteristics ==
=== Physical and atomic ===
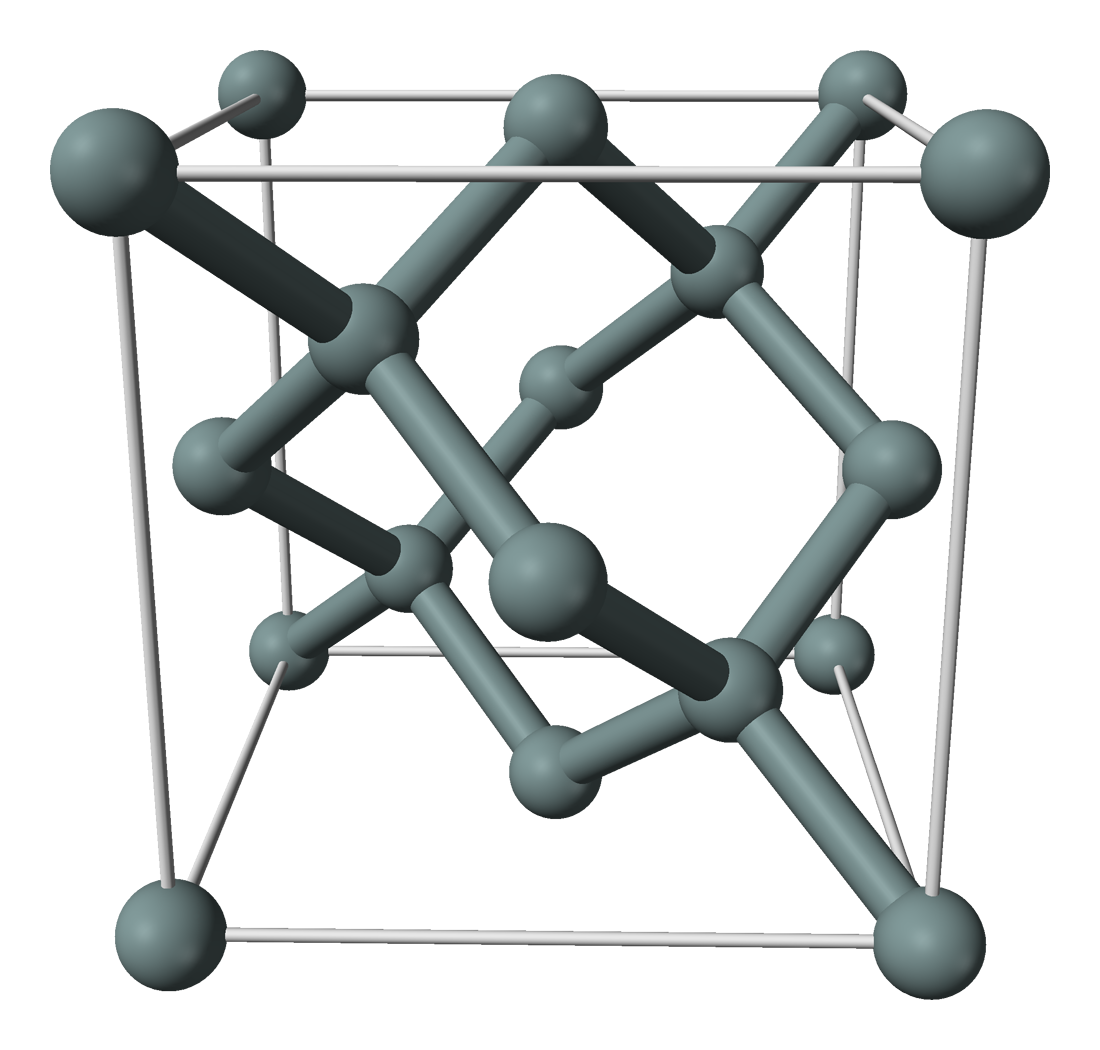
Silicon crystallizes in a diamond cubic crystal structure by forming sp^{3} hybrid orbitals.

A silicon atom has fourteen electrons. In the ground state, they are arranged in the electron configuration [Ne]3s^{2}3p^{2}. Of these, four are valence electrons, occupying the 3s orbital and two of the 3p orbitals. Like the other members of its group, the lighter carbon and the heavier germanium, tin, and lead, it has the same number of valence electrons as valence orbitals: hence, it can complete its octet and obtain the stable noble gas configuration of argon by forming sp^{3} hybrid orbitals, forming tetrahedral SiX_{4} derivatives where the central silicon atom shares an electron pair with each of the four atoms it is bonded to. The first four ionisation energies of silicon are 786.3, 1576.5, 3228.3, and 4354.4 kJ/mol respectively; these figures are high enough to preclude the possibility of simple cationic chemistry for the element. Following periodic trends, its single-bond covalent radius of 117.6 pm is intermediate between those of carbon (77.2 pm) and germanium (122.3 pm). The hexacoordinate ionic radius of silicon may be considered to be 40 pm, although this must be taken as a purely notional figure given the lack of a simple Si^{4+} cation in reality.

==== Electrical ====
At standard temperature and pressure, silicon is a shiny semiconductor with a bluish-grey metallic lustre; as typical for semiconductors, its resistivity drops as temperature rises. This arises because silicon has a small energy gap (band gap) between its highest occupied energy levels (the valence band) and the lowest unoccupied ones (the conduction band). The Fermi level is about halfway between the valence and conduction bands and is the energy at which a state is as likely to be occupied by an electron as not. Hence pure silicon is effectively an insulator at room temperature. However, doping silicon with a pnictogen such as phosphorus, arsenic, or antimony introduces one extra electron per dopant and these may then be excited into the conduction band either thermally or photolytically, creating an n-type semiconductor. Similarly, doping silicon with a group 13 element such as boron, aluminium, or gallium results in the introduction of acceptor levels that trap electrons that may be excited from the filled valence band, creating a p-type semiconductor. Joining n-type silicon to p-type silicon creates a p–n junction with a common Fermi level; electrons flow from n to p, while holes flow from p to n, creating a voltage drop. This p–n junction thus acts as a diode that can rectify alternating current that allows current to pass more easily one way than the other. A transistor is an n–p–n junction, with a thin layer of weakly p-type silicon between two n-type regions. Biasing the emitter through a small forward voltage and the collector through a large reverse voltage allows the transistor to act as a triode amplifier.

==== Crystal structure ====
Silicon crystallises in a giant covalent structure at standard conditions, specifically in a diamond cubic crystal lattice (space group 227). It thus has a high melting point of 1414 °C, as a lot of energy is required to break the strong covalent bonds and melt the solid. Upon melting, silicon contracts, as the long-range tetrahedral network of bonds breaks up and the voids in that network are filled in, similar to water ice when hydrogen bonds are broken upon melting. It does not have any thermodynamically stable allotropes at standard pressure, but several other crystal structures are known at higher pressures. The general trend is one of increasing coordination number with pressure, culminating in a hexagonal close-packed allotrope at about 40 gigapascals known as Si–VII (the standard modification being Si–I). An allotrope called BC8 (or bc8), having a body-centred cubic lattice with eight atoms per primitive unit cell (space group 206), can be created at high pressure and remains metastable at low pressure. Its properties have been studied in detail.

Silicon boils at 3265 °C: this, while high, is still lower than the temperature at which its lighter congener carbon sublimes (3642 °C) and silicon similarly has a lower heat of vaporisation than carbon, consistent with the fact that the Si–Si bond is weaker than the C–C bond.

It is also possible to construct silicene layers analogous to graphene.

=== Isotopes ===
Naturally occurring silicon is composed of three stable isotopes, ^{28}Si (92.24%), ^{29}Si (4.67%), and ^{30}Si (3.07%). Out of these, only the odd ^{29}Si is of use in NMR and EPR spectroscopy, and it has nuclear spin (I =1/2). All three are produced in Type Ia supernovae through the oxygen-burning process, with ^{28}Si being made as part of the alpha process and hence the most abundant. The fusion of ^{28}Si with alpha particles by photodisintegration rearrangement in stars is known as the silicon-burning process; it is the last stage of stellar nucleosynthesis before the rapid collapse and violent explosion of the star in question in a type II supernova.

Twenty-two radioisotopes have been characterized, the two stablest being ^{32}Si with a half-life of about 157 years, and ^{31}Si with a half-life of 2.62 hours. All the remaining radioactive isotopes have half-lives that are less than seven seconds, and the majority of these have half-lives that are less than one-tenth of a second. ^{32}Si undergoes low-energy beta decay to ^{32}P and then stable ^{32}S. ^{31}Si may be produced by the neutron activation of natural silicon and is thus useful for quantitative analysis; it can be easily detected by its characteristic beta decay to stable ^{31}P, in which the emitted electron carries up to 1.48 MeV of energy.

The known isotopes of silicon range in mass number from 22 to 45. The most common decay mode of the isotopes with mass numbers lower than the three stable isotopes is β^{+} decay to aluminium isotopes, and the most common decay mode for the heavier unstable isotopes is beta decay to phosphorus isotopes as decay products. ^{46}Si was reported in collisions of ^{70}Zn with Be in experiments at the Radioactive Isotope Beam Factory.

Silicon can enter the oceans through groundwater and riverine transport. Large fluxes of groundwater input have an isotopic composition which is distinct from riverine silicon inputs. Isotopic variations in groundwater and riverine transports contribute to variations in oceanic ^{30}Si values. Currently, there are substantial differences in the isotopic values of deep water in the world's ocean basins. Between the Atlantic and Pacific oceans, there is a deep water ^{30}Si gradient of greater than 0.3 parts per thousand. ^{30}Si is most commonly associated with productivity in the oceans.

== Chemistry and compounds ==
C–X and Si–X bond energies (kJ/mol)
X =	C	Si	H	F	Cl	Br	I	O–	N<
C–X	368	360	435	453	351	293	216	~360	~305
Si–X	360	340	393	565	381	310	234	452	322

Crystalline bulk silicon is rather inert, but becomes more reactive at high temperatures. Like its neighbour aluminium, silicon forms a thin, continuous surface layer of silicon dioxide (SiO_{2}) that protects the material beneath from oxidation. Because of this, silicon does not measurably react with the air below 900 °C. Between 950 °C and 1160 °C, the formation rate of the vitreous dioxide rapidly increases, and when 1400 °C is reached, atmospheric nitrogen also reacts to give the nitrides SiN and Si_{3}N_{4}. Silicon reacts with gaseous sulfur at 600 °C and gaseous phosphorus at 1000 °C. This oxide layer nevertheless does not prevent reaction with the halogens; fluorine attacks silicon vigorously at room temperature, chlorine does so at about 300 °C, and bromine and iodine at about 500 °C. Silicon does not react with most aqueous acids, but is oxidised and complexed by hydrofluoric acid mixtures containing either chlorine or nitric acid to form hexafluorosilicates. It readily dissolves in hot aqueous alkali to form silicates. At high temperatures, silicon also reacts with alkyl halides; this reaction may be catalysed by copper to directly synthesise organosilicon chlorides as precursors to silicone polymers. Upon melting, silicon becomes extremely reactive, alloying with most metals to form silicides, and reducing most metal oxides because the heat of formation of silicon dioxide is so large. In fact, molten silicon reacts virtually with every known kind of crucible material (except its own oxide, SiO_{2}). This happens due to silicon's high binding forces for the light elements and to its high dissolving power for most elements. As a result, containers for liquid silicon must be made of refractory, unreactive materials such as zirconium dioxide or group 4, 5, and 6 borides.

Tetrahedral coordination is a major structural motif in silicon chemistry just as it is for carbon chemistry. However, the 3p subshell is rather more diffuse than the 2p subshell and does not hybridise so well with the 3s subshell. As a result, the chemistry of silicon and its heavier congeners shows significant differences from that of carbon, and thus octahedral coordination is also significant. For example, the electronegativity of silicon (1.90) is much less than that of carbon (2.55), because the valence electrons of silicon are further from the nucleus than those of carbon and hence experience smaller electrostatic forces of attraction from the nucleus. The poor overlap of 3p orbitals also results in a much lower tendency toward catenation (formation of Si–Si bonds) for silicon than for carbon, due to the concomitant weakening of the Si–Si bond compared to the C–C bond: the average Si–Si bond energy is approximately 226 kJ/mol, compared to a value of 356 kJ/mol for the C–C bond. This results in multiply bonded silicon compounds generally being much less stable than their carbon counterparts, an example of the double bond rule. On the other hand, the presence of radial nodes in the 3p orbitals of silicon suggests the possibility of hypervalence, as seen in five and six-coordinate derivatives of silicon such as SiX^{−}_{5} and SiF^{2−}_{6}. Lastly, because of the increasing energy gap between the valence s and p orbitals as the group is descended, the divalent state grows in importance from carbon to lead, so that a few unstable divalent compounds are known for silicon; this lowering of the main oxidation state, in tandem with increasing atomic radii, results in an increase of metallic character down the group. Silicon already shows some incipient metallic behavior, particularly in the behavior of its oxide compounds and its reaction with acids as well as bases (though this takes some effort), and is hence often referred to as a metalloid rather than a nonmetal. Germanium shows more, and tin is generally considered a metal.

Silicon shows clear differences from carbon. For example, organic chemistry has very few analogies with silicon chemistry, while silicate minerals have a structural complexity unseen in oxocarbons. Silicon tends to resemble germanium far more than it does carbon, and this resemblance is enhanced by the d-block contraction, resulting in the size of the germanium atom being much closer to that of the silicon atom than periodic trends would predict. Nevertheless, there are still some differences because of the growing importance of the divalent state in germanium compared to silicon. Additionally, the lower Ge–O bond strength compared to the Si–O bond strength results in the absence of "germanone" polymers that would be analogous to silicone polymers.

== Occurrence ==
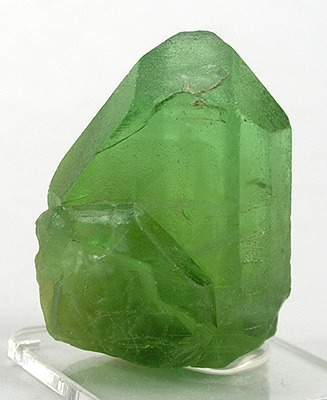
Olivine

Silicon is the eighth most abundant element in the universe, coming after hydrogen, helium, oxygen, carbon, neon, iron, and nitrogen. This differs from abundance of elements in Earth's crust due to substantial separation of the elements taking place during the formation of the Solar System. Silicon makes up 27.2% of the Earth's crust by weight, second only to oxygen at 45.5%, with which it always is associated in nature. Further fractionation took place in the formation of the Earth by planetary differentiation: Earth's core, which makes up 31.5% of the mass of the Earth, has approximate composition Fe_{25}Ni_{2}Co_{0.1}S_{3}; the mantle makes up 68.1% of the Earth's mass and is composed mostly of denser oxides and silicates, an example being olivine, (Mg,Fe)_{2}SiO_{4}; while the lighter siliceous minerals such as aluminosilicates rise to the surface and form the crust, making up 0.4% of the Earth's mass.

The crystallisation of igneous rocks from magma depends on a number of factors; among them are the chemical composition of the magma, the cooling rate, and some properties of the individual minerals to be formed, such as lattice energy, melting point, and complexity of their crystal structure. As magma is cooled, olivine appears first, followed by pyroxene, amphibole, biotite mica, orthoclase feldspar, muscovite mica, quartz, zeolites, and finally, hydrothermal minerals. This sequence shows a trend toward increasingly complex silicate units with cooling, and the introduction of hydroxide and fluoride anions in addition to oxides. Many metals may substitute for silicon. After these igneous rocks undergo weathering, transport, and deposition, sedimentary rocks like clay, shale, and sandstone are formed. Metamorphism also may occur at high temperatures and pressures, creating an even vaster variety of minerals.

There are four sources for silicon fluxes into the ocean: chemical weathering of continental rocks, river transport, dissolution of continental terrigenous silicates, and the reaction between submarine basalts and hydrothermal fluid which release dissolved silicon. All four of these fluxes are interconnected in the ocean's biogeochemical cycle as they all were initially formed from the weathering of Earth's crust.

Approximately 300–900 megatonnes of aeolian dust is deposited into the world's oceans each year. Of that value, 80–240 megatonnes are in the form of particulate silicon. The total amount of particulate silicon deposition into the ocean is still less than the amount of silicon influx into the ocean via riverine transportation. Aeolian inputs of particulate lithogenic silicon into the North Atlantic and Western North Pacific oceans are the result of dust settling on the oceans from the Sahara and Gobi Desert, respectively. Riverine transports are the major source of silicon influx into the ocean in coastal regions, while silicon deposition in the open ocean is greatly influenced by the settling of aeolian dust.

== Production ==
Silicon production

Silicon of 96–99% purity is made by carbothermically reducing quartzite or sand with highly pure coke. The reduction is carried out in an electric arc furnace, using an excess of SiO_{2} to prevent silicon carbide (SiC) from accumulating:

SiO_{2} + 2 C → Si + 2 CO
2 SiC + SiO_{2} → 3 Si + 2 CO

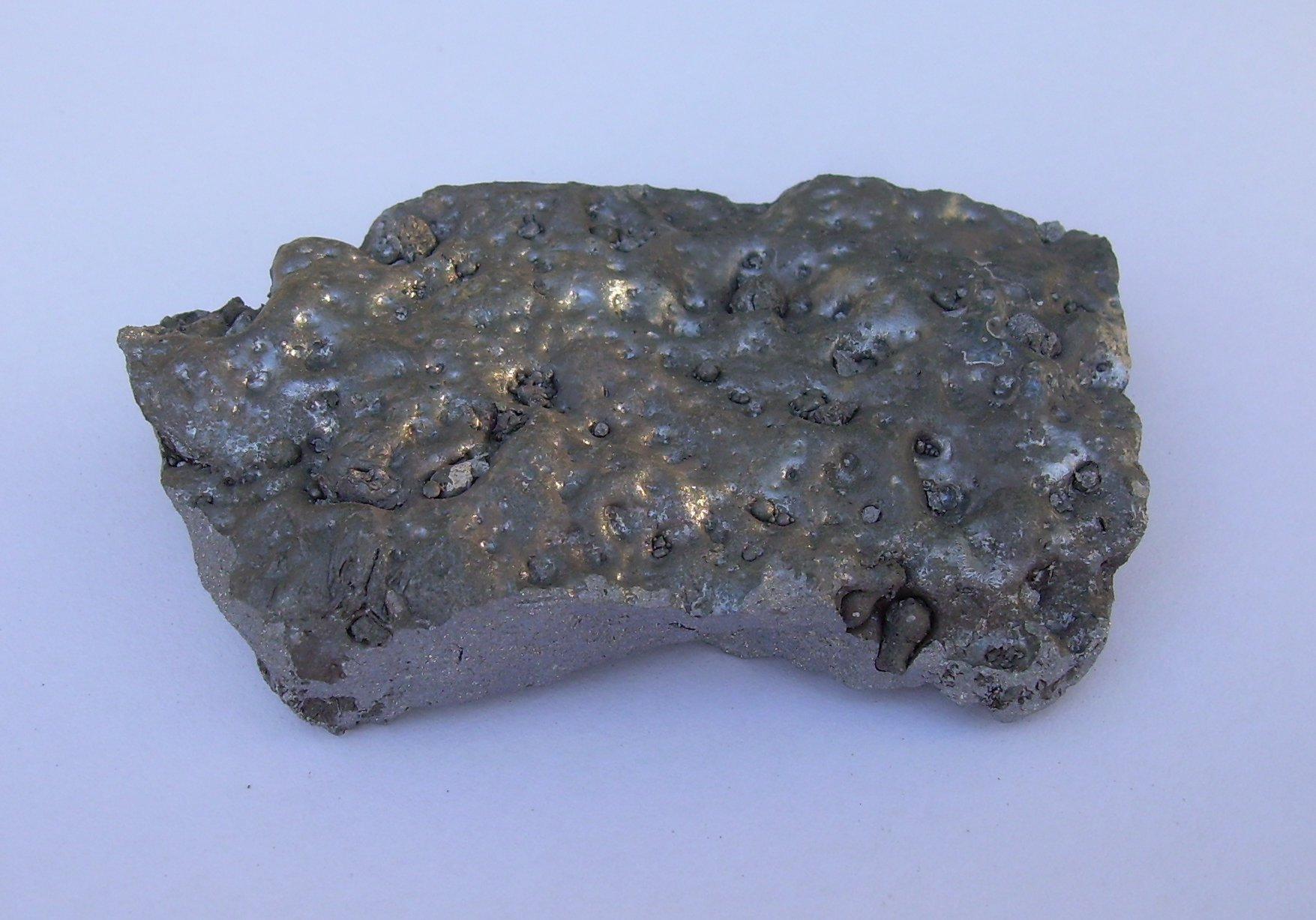
Ferrosilicon alloy

This reaction, known as carbothermal reduction of silicon dioxide, is usually conducted in the presence of scrap iron with low amounts of phosphorus and sulfur, producing ferrosilicon. Ferrosilicon, an iron-silicon alloy that contains varying ratios of elemental silicon and iron, accounts for about 80% of the world's production of elemental silicon, with China, the leading supplier of elemental silicon, providing 4.6 million tonnes (or two-thirds of world output) of silicon, most of it in the form of ferrosilicon. It is followed by Russia (610,000 t), Norway (330,000 t), Brazil (240,000 t), and the United States (170,000 t). Ferrosilicon is primarily used by the iron and steel industry (see below) with primary use as alloying addition in iron or steel and for de-oxidation of steel in integrated steel plants. Most elemental silicon produced remains as a ferrosilicon alloy, and only approximately 20% is refined to metallurgical grade purity (a total of 1.3–1.5 million metric tons/year). An estimated 15% of the world production of metallurgical grade silicon is further refined to semiconductor purity.

Another reaction, sometimes used, is aluminothermal reduction of silicon dioxide, as follows:

3 SiO_{2} + 4 Al → 3 Si + 2 Al_{2}O_{3}

Leaching powdered 96–97% pure silicon with water results in ~98.5% pure silicon, which is used in the chemical industry. However, even greater purity is needed for semiconductor applications, and this is produced from the reduction of tetrachlorosilane (silicon tetrachloride) or trichlorosilane. The former is made by chlorinating scrap silicon and the latter is a byproduct of silicone production. These compounds are volatile and hence can be purified by repeated fractional distillation, followed by reduction to elemental silicon with very pure zinc metal as the reducing agent. The spongy pieces of silicon thus produced are melted and then grown to form cylindrical single crystals, before being purified by zone refining. Other routes use the thermal decomposition of silane or tetraiodosilane (SiI_{4}). Another process used is the reduction of sodium hexafluorosilicate, a common waste product of the phosphate fertilizer industry, by metallic sodium: this is highly exothermic and hence requires no outside energy source. Hyperfine silicon is made at a higher purity than almost any other material: transistor production requires impurity levels in silicon crystals less than 1 part per 10^{10}, and in special cases impurity levels below 1 part per 10^{12} are needed and attained.

Silicon nanostructures can directly be produced from silica sand using conventional metalothermic processes, or the combustion synthesis approach. Such nanostructured silicon materials can be used in various functional applications including the anode of lithium-ion batteries (LIBs), other ion batteries, future computing devices like memristors or photocatalytic applications.

== Applications ==
=== Compounds ===
Most silicon is used industrially without being purified, often with comparatively little processing from its natural form. More than 90% of the Earth's crust is composed of silicate minerals, which are compounds of silicon and oxygen, often with metallic ions when negatively charged silicate anions require cations to balance the charge. Many of these have direct commercial uses, such as clays, silica sand, and most kinds of building stone. Thus, the vast majority of uses for silicon are as structural compounds, either as the silicate minerals or silica (crude silicon dioxide). Silicates are used in making Portland cement (made mostly of calcium silicates) which is used in building mortar and modern stucco, but more importantly, combined with silica sand, and gravel (usually containing silicate minerals such as granite), to make the concrete that is the basis of most of the very largest industrial building projects of the modern world.

Silica is used to make fire brick, a type of ceramic. Silicate minerals are also in whiteware ceramics, an important class of products usually containing various types of fired clay minerals (natural aluminium phyllosilicates). An example is porcelain, which is based on the silicate mineral kaolinite. Traditional glass (silica-based soda–lime glass) also functions in many of the same ways, and also is used for windows and containers. In addition, specialty silica based glass fibers are used for optical fiber, as well as to produce fiberglass for structural support and glass wool for thermal insulation.

Silicones often are used in waterproofing treatments, molding compounds, mold-release agents, mechanical seals, high temperature greases and waxes, and caulking compounds. Silicone is also sometimes used in breast implants, contact lenses, explosives and pyrotechnics. Silly Putty was originally made by adding boric acid to silicone oil. Other silicon compounds function as high-technology abrasives and new high-strength ceramics based upon silicon carbide. Silicon is a component of some superalloys.

=== Alloys ===
Elemental silicon is added to molten iron as ferrosilicon alloys to improve performance in casting thin sections and to prevent the formation of cementite where exposed to outside air. The presence of elemental silicon in molten iron acts as a sink for oxygen, so that the steel carbon content, which must be kept within narrow limits for each type of steel, can be more closely controlled. Around 75% of ferrosilicon produced is used in the steel industry. Silicon is an important constituent of transformer steel, modifying its resistivity and ferromagnetic properties.

The properties of silicon may be used to modify alloys with metals other than iron. "Metallurgical grade" silicon is silicon of 95–99% purity. About 55% of the world consumption of metallurgical purity silicon goes for production of aluminium-silicon alloys (silumin alloys) for aluminium part casts, mainly for use in the automotive industry. Silicon's importance in aluminium casting is that a significantly high amount (12%) of silicon in aluminium forms a eutectic mixture which solidifies with very little thermal contraction. This greatly reduces tearing and cracks formed from stress as casting alloys cool to solidity. Silicon also significantly improves the hardness and thus wear-resistance of aluminium. Metallurgical grade silicon is made by melting quartz or quartzite in a large arc furnace, in a carbothermal reduction process with carbon-containing material such as coal, coke or charcoal and woodchips for gas circulation. This production technique without iron is often used for polysilicon production for photovoltaics and also semiconductors.

=== Electronics ===
Silicon semiconductor devices enable modern information technology. The electronic applications are broad, including microelectronics, computing, optoelectronics, and nanotechnology. Among the many advantages of silicon for electronics are: low cost, formation of large pure single crystals, not brittle, conducts heat generated by electrical activity adequately, can be micro-structured and modified in layers, and its oxide is an excellent insulator.

An estimated 15% of the world production of metallurgical grade silicon is refined to semiconductor purity. This is typically the "nine-9" or 99.9999999% purity, nearly defect-free single crystalline material.

Monocrystalline silicon of such purity is usually produced by the Czochralski process, and is used to produce silicon wafers used in the semiconductor industry, in electronics, and in some high-cost and high-efficiency photovoltaic applications. Pure silicon is an intrinsic semiconductor, which means that unlike metals, it conducts electron holes and electrons released from atoms by heat. Intrinsic silicon's electrical conductivity increases with temperature due to the broadening of the Fermi-Dirac distribution. Pure silicon has too low a conductivity (i.e., too high a resistivity) to be used as a circuit element in electronics. In practice, pure silicon is doped with small concentrations of elements with differing valence electron count (typically boron and phosphorus), which greatly increase its conductivity and adjust its electrical response by controlling the number and type (positive or negative) of activated charge carriers. Such control is necessary for transistors, solar cells, semiconductor detectors, and other semiconductor devices used in the computer industry and other technical applications. In silicon photonics, silicon may be used as a continuous wave Raman laser medium to produce coherent light.

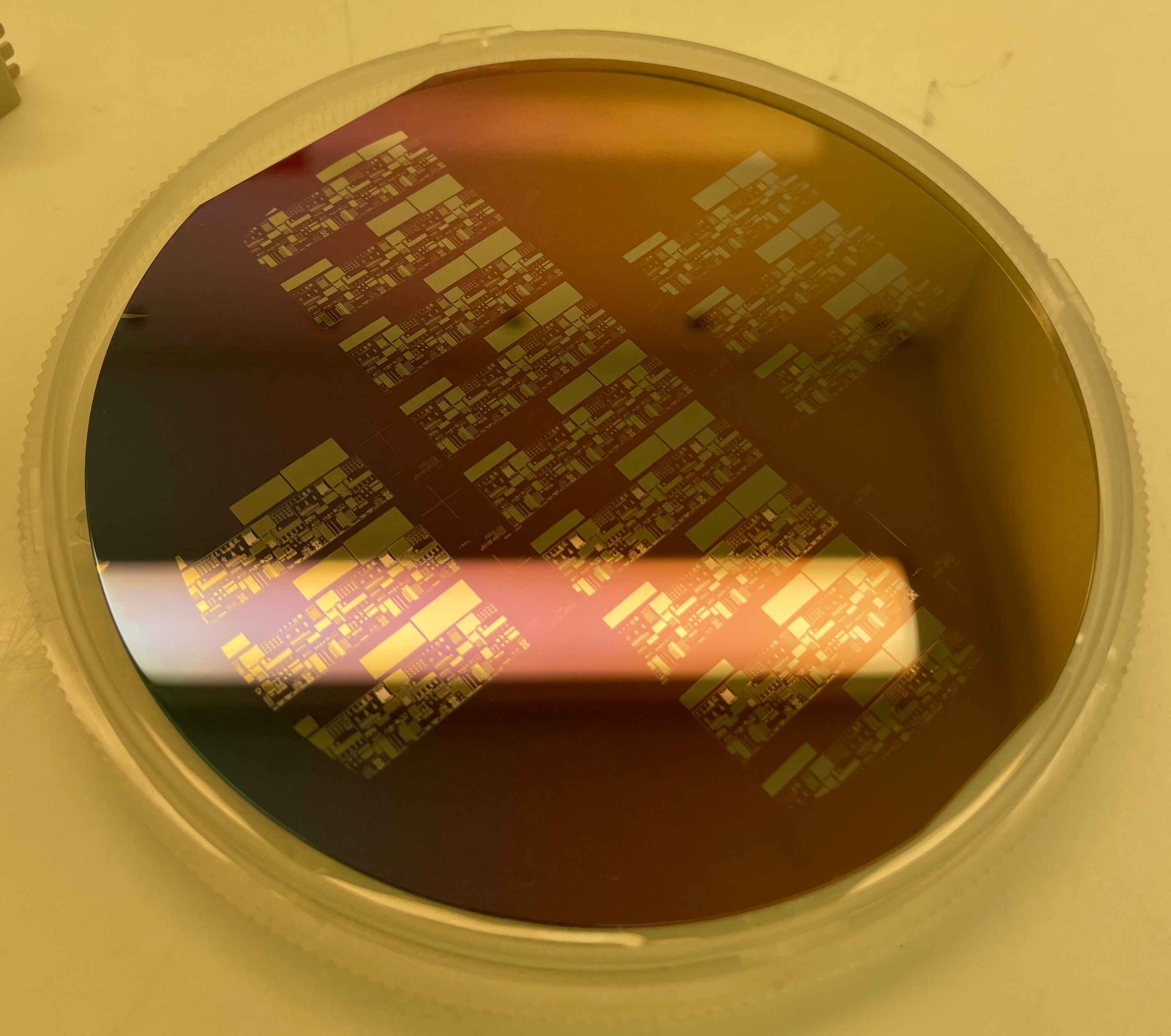
Silicon wafer which has been thermally oxidized using water vapor at 1100º C for ~30 nm of silicon dioxide. The clear regions have been etched bare for subsequent doping.

In common integrated circuits, a wafer of mono-crystalline silicon (Si) serves as a mechanical support for the circuits. Circuit elements (transistors) are created by doping and passivated by thin layers of silicon oxide, an insulator that is easily produced on Si surfaces by processes of thermal oxidation or chemical vapor deposition (CVD) (among other methods). Thermal oxidation is most common and involves exposing Si to oxygen under the specific conditions. The resulting oxide thickness can be predicted by the Deal–Grove model. Silicon is the most popular material for integrated circuits due to the high stability and ease of forming its native oxide (SiO_{2}). The insulating oxide of silicon is not soluble in water, which gives it an advantage over germanium. Germanium (Ge) was used for the first version of the transistor and has similar electronic properties to silicon such as carrier mobility and band gap. However Ge based technologies ultimately failed due to the instability of the GeO_{2}. Germanium is still used in modern semiconductor electronics as a dopant to enhance the mobility of holes in the source and drain of PMOS.

Monocrystalline silicon is expensive to produce, and is usually justified only in production of integrated circuits, where tiny crystal imperfections can interfere with tiny circuit paths. For other uses, other types of pure silicon may be employed. These include hydrogenated amorphous silicon and upgraded metallurgical-grade silicon (UMG-Si) used in the production of low-cost, large-area electronics in applications such as liquid-crystal displays and of large-area, low-cost, thin-film solar cells. Such semiconductor grades of silicon are either slightly less pure or polycrystalline rather than monocrystalline, and are produced in comparable quantities as the monocrystalline silicon: 75,000 to 150,000 metric tons per year. The market for the lesser grade is growing more quickly than for monocrystalline silicon. By 2013, polycrystalline silicon production, used mostly in solar cells, was projected to reach 200,000 metric tons per year, while monocrystalline semiconductor grade silicon was expected to remain less than 50,000 tons per year.

=== Quantum dots ===
Silicon quantum dots are created through the thermal processing of hydrogen silsesquioxane into nanocrystals ranging from a few nanometers to a few microns, displaying size dependent luminescent properties. The nanocrystals display large Stokes shifts converting photons in the ultraviolet range to photons in the visible or infrared, depending on the particle size, allowing for applications in quantum dot displays and luminescent solar concentrators due to their limited self absorption. A benefit of using silicon based quantum dots over cadmium or indium is the non-toxic, metal-free nature of silicon. Another application of silicon quantum dots is for sensing of hazardous materials. The sensors take advantage of the luminescent properties of the quantum dots through quenching of the photoluminescence in the presence of the hazardous substance. There are many methods used for hazardous chemical sensing with a few being electron transfer, fluorescence resonance energy transfer, and photocurrent generation. Electron transfer quenching occurs when the lowest unoccupied molecular orbital (LUMO) is slightly lower in energy than the conduction band of the quantum dot, allowing for the transfer of electrons between the two, preventing recombination of the holes and electrons within the nanocrystals. The effect can also be achieved in reverse with a donor molecule having its highest occupied molecular orbital (HOMO) slightly higher than a valence band edge of the quantum dot, allowing electrons to transfer between them, filling the holes and preventing recombination. Fluorescence resonance energy transfer occurs when a complex forms between the quantum dot and a quencher molecule. The complex will continue to absorb light but when the energy is converted to the ground state it does not release a photon, quenching the material. The third method uses different approach by measuring the photocurrent emitted by the quantum dots instead of monitoring the photoluminescent display. If the concentration of the desired chemical increases then the photocurrent given off by the nanocrystals will change in response.

=== Thermal energy storage ===
Solid or molten silicon offers much higher storage temperatures than salts with consequent greater capacity and efficiency. It is being researched as a possible more energy efficient storage technology. Silicon is able to store more than 1 MWh of energy per cubic meter at 1400 °C. An additional advantage is the relative abundance of silicon when compared to the salts used for the same purpose.

Hot silicon thermal energy storing technology would be able to store significant thermal energy at extremely high temperatures (around 1400-2000 °C). This would be utilized by using the white hot molten silicon to store excess electricity generated from surrounding renewable sources like solar energy and wind power. This system would enable efficient, lower costing, and a longer duration of energy storage compared to other sensible heat storage options.

== Biological role ==
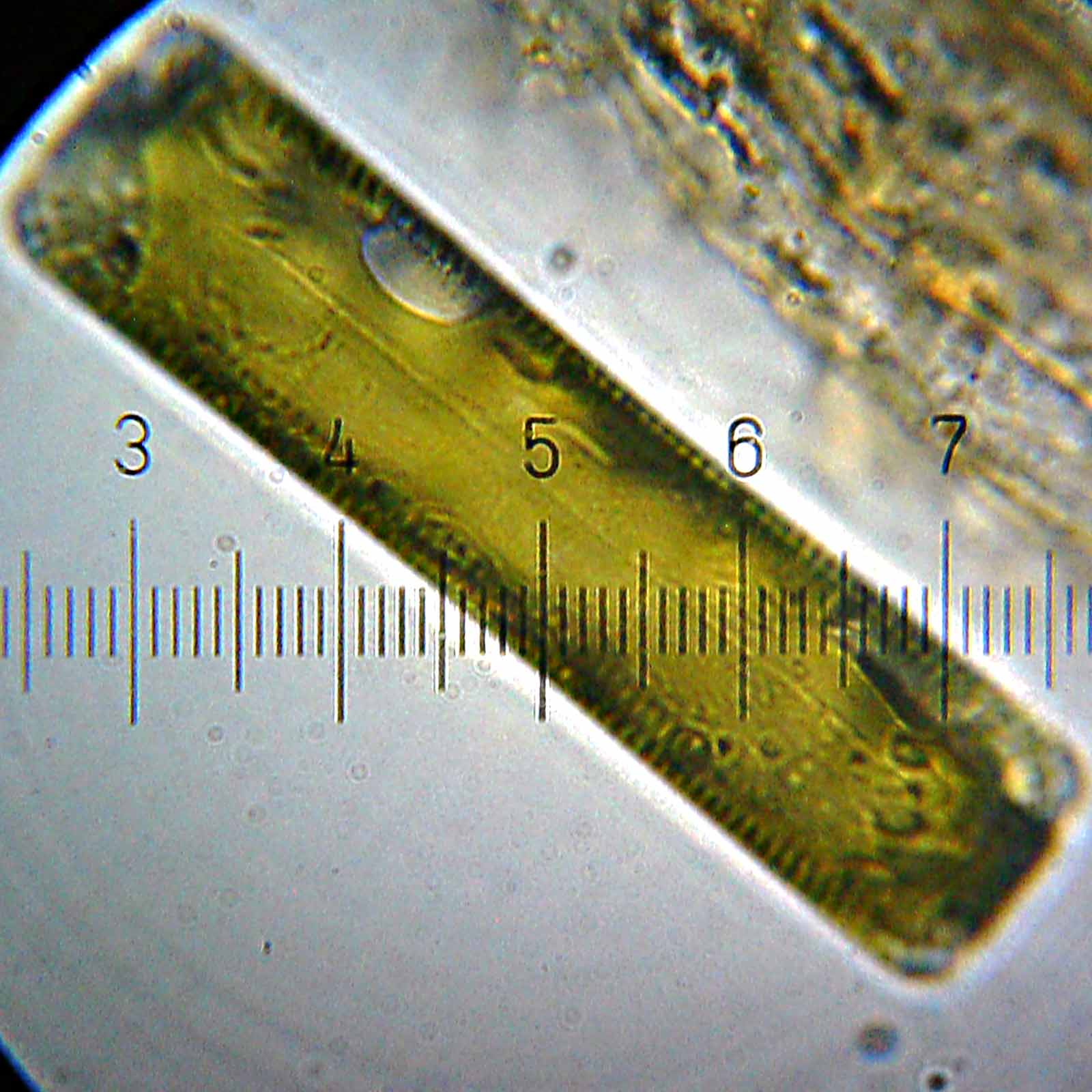
A diatom, enclosed in a silica cell wall

Although silicon is readily available in the form of silicates, very few organisms use it directly. Diatoms, radiolaria, and siliceous sponges use biogenic silica as a structural material for their skeletons. Some plants accumulate silica in their tissues and require silicon for their growth, for example rice. Silicon may be taken up by plants as orthosilicic acid (also known as monosilicic acid) and transported through the xylem, where it forms amorphous complexes with components of the cell wall. This has been shown to improve cell wall strength and structural integrity in some plants, thereby reducing insect herbivory and pathogenic infections. In certain plants, silicon may also upregulate the production of volatile organic compounds and phytohormones which play a significant role in plant defense mechanisms. In more advanced plants, silica (opal) phytoliths provide structural support.

Several horticultural crops are known to protect themselves against fungal plant pathogens with silica, to such a degree that fungicide application may fail unless accompanied by sufficient silicon nutrition. Silicaceous plant defense molecules activate some phytoalexins, meaning some of them are signalling substances producing acquired immunity. When deprived, some plants will substitute with increased production of other defensive substances.

Life on Earth is largely composed of carbon, but astrobiology considers that extraterrestrial life may have other hypothetical types of biochemistry. Silicon is considered an alternative to carbon, as it can create complex and stable molecules with four covalent bonds, required for a DNA-analog, and it is available in large quantities.

=== Marine microbial influences ===
Diatoms use silicon in the biogenic silica (bSi) form, which is taken up by the silicon transport protein (SIT) to be predominantly used in the cell wall structure as frustules. Silicon enters the ocean in a dissolved form such as silicic acid or silicate. Since diatoms are one of the main users of these forms of silicon, they contribute greatly to the concentration of silicon throughout the ocean. Silicon forms a nutrient-like profile in the ocean due to the diatom productivity in shallow depths. Therefore, concentration of silicon is lower in the shallow ocean and higher in the deep ocean.

Diatom productivity in the upper ocean contributes to the amount of silicon exported to the lower ocean. When diatom cells are lysed in the upper ocean, their nutrients such as iron, zinc, and silicon, are brought to the lower ocean through a process called marine snow. Marine snow involves the downward transfer of particulate organic matter by vertical mixing of dissolved organic matter. It has been suggested that silicon is considered crucial to diatom productivity and as long as there is silicic acid available for diatoms to use, the diatoms can contribute to other important nutrient concentrations in the deep ocean as well.

In coastal zones, diatoms serve as the major phytoplanktonic organisms and greatly contribute to biogenic silica production. In the open ocean, however, diatoms have a reduced role in global annual silica production. Diatoms in North Atlantic and North Pacific subtropical gyres only contribute about 5–7% of global annual marine silica production. The Southern Ocean produces about one-third of global marine biogenic silica. The Southern Ocean is referred to as having a "biogeochemical divide" since only minuscule amounts of silicon are transported out of this region.

=== Human nutrition ===
There is some evidence that silicon is important to human health for nail, hair, bone, and skin tissues. Some studies demonstrate that premenopausal women with higher dietary silicon intake have higher bone density, and that silicon supplementation can increase bone volume and density in patients with osteoporosis. Silicon is needed for synthesis of elastin and collagen, of which the aorta contains the greatest quantity in the human body, and has been considered an essential element; nevertheless, it is difficult to prove its essentiality, because silicon is very common, and hence, deficiency symptoms are difficult to reproduce.

Silicon was recognized as a "nutritive element" by the International Plant Nutrition Institute (IPNI) and a "beneficial substance" by the Association of American Plant Food Control Officials.

== Safety ==
People may be exposed to elemental silicon in the workplace by breathing it in, swallowing it, or having contact with the skin or eye. In the latter two cases, silicon poses a slight hazard as an irritant. It is hazardous if inhaled. The Occupational Safety and Health Administration (OSHA) has set the legal limit for silicon exposure in the workplace as 15 mg/m^{3} total exposure and 5 mg/m^{3} respiratory exposure over an eight-hour workday. The National Institute for Occupational Safety and Health (NIOSH) has set a recommended exposure limit (REL) of 10 mg/m^{3} total exposure and 5 mg/m^{3} respiratory exposure over an eight-hour workday. Inhalation of crystalline silica dust may lead to silicosis, an occupational lung disease marked by inflammation and scarring in the form of nodular lesions in the upper lobes of the lungs.

== See also ==
- Amorphous silicon
- Black silicon
- Covalent superconductors
- List of countries by silicon production
- List of silicon producers
- Monocrystalline silicon
- Polycrystalline silicon
- Printed silicon electronics
- Silicene
- Silicon nanowire
- Silicon tombac
- Silicon Valley
- Spruce Pine Mining District
- Transistor
