= Sodium fluoride =

Ionic compound (NaF)

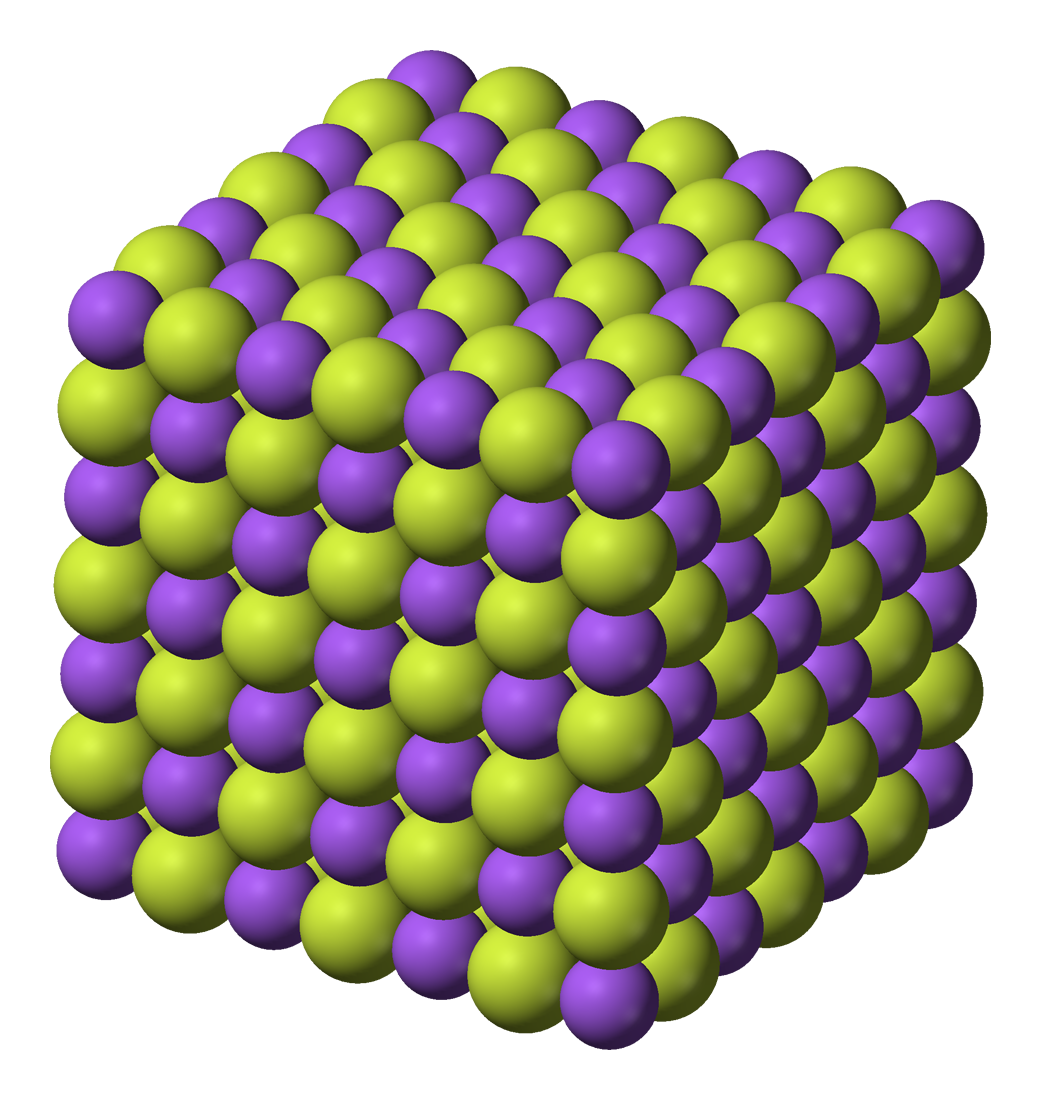
- Sodium fluoride

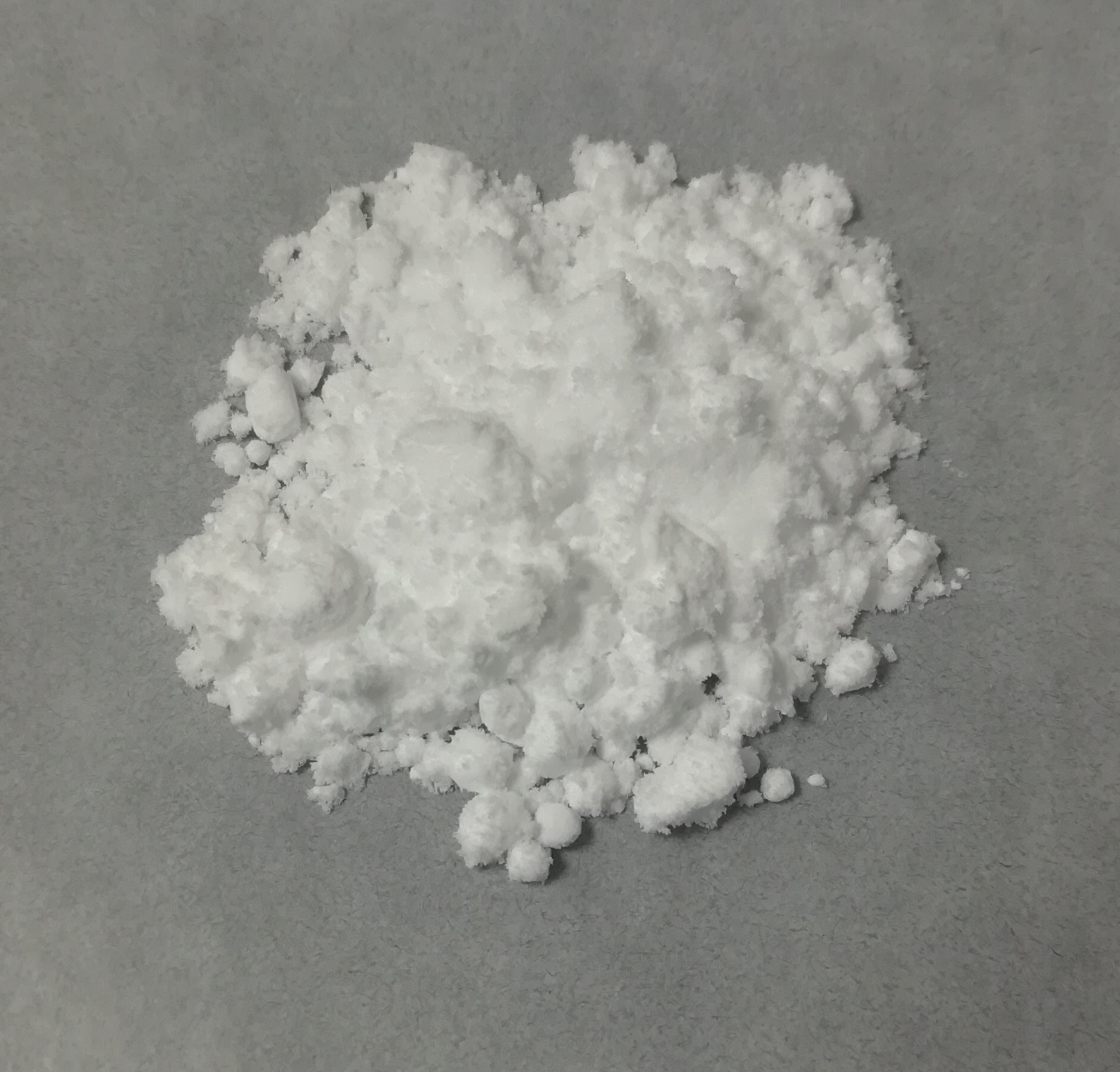
- Sample of sodium fluoride, AR grade

Names
Pronunciation	/ˌsoʊdiəm ˈflʊəraɪd/
- IUPAC name Sodium fluoride
- Other names Florocid

Identifiers
CAS Number	7681-49-4
ChEBI	CHEBI:28741
ChEMBL	ChEMBL1528
ChemSpider	5045
ECHA InfoCard	100.028.789
EC Number	231-667-8
KEGG	C08142
PubChem CID	5235
RTECS number	WB0350000
UNII	8ZYQ1474W7
UN number	1690
CompTox Dashboard (EPA)	DTXSID2020630
- InChI: InChI=1S/FH.Na/h1H;/q;+1/p-1 Key: PUZPDOWCWNUUKD-UHFFFAOYSA-M; InChI=1/FH.Na/h1H;/q;+1/p-1 Key: PUZPDOWCWNUUKD-REWHXWOFAH

Properties
Chemical formula	NaF
Molar mass	41.98817244 g·mol^{−1}
Appearance	White to greenish solid
Odor	odorless
Density	2.558 g/cm^{3}
Melting point	993 °C (1,819 °F; 1,266 K)
Boiling point	1,704 °C (3,099 °F; 1,977 K)
Solubility in water	36.4 g/L (0 °C); 40.4 g/L (20 °C); 50.5 g/L (100 °C)
Solubility	slightly soluble in HF, ammonia negligible in alcohol, acetone, SO_{2}, dimethylformamide
Vapor pressure	1 mmHg @ 1077 °C
Acidity (pK_{a})	3,20 (weak base, see HF)
Magnetic susceptibility (χ)	−16.4·10^{−6} cm^{3}/mol
Refractive index (n_{D})	1.3252

Structure
Crystal structure	Cubic
Lattice constant	a = 462 pm
Molecular shape	Octahedral

Thermochemistry
Heat capacity (C)	46.82 J/(mol K)
Std molar entropy (S^{⦵}_{298})	51.3 J/(mol K)
Std enthalpy of formation (Δ_{f}H^{⦵}_{298})	−573.6 kJ/mol
Gibbs free energy (Δ_{f}G^{⦵})	−543.3 kJ/mol

Pharmacology
ATC code	A01AA01 (WHO) A12CD01 (WHO), V09IX06 (WHO) (^{18}F)

Hazards
- GHS labelling
Pictograms	(GHS07: Exclamation mark) (GHS08: Health hazard)
Signal word	Danger
Hazard statements	H301, H315, H319, H335
NFPA 704 (fire diamond)	3 0 0
Flash point	Non-flammable
- Lethal dose or concentration (LD, LC)
LD_{50} (median dose)	52–130 mg/kg (oral in rats, mice, rabbits)
- NIOSH (US health exposure limits)
PEL (Permissible)	TWA 2.5 mg/m^{3}
REL (Recommended)	TWA 2.5 mg/m^{3}
IDLH (Immediate danger)	250 mg/m^{3} (as F)
- Safety data sheet (SDS)

Related compounds
Other anions	Sodium chloride Sodium bromide Sodium iodide Sodium astatide
Other cations	Lithium fluoride Potassium fluoride Rubidium fluoride Caesium fluoride Francium fluoride
Related compounds	TASF reagent
- Except where otherwise noted, data are given for materials in their standard state (at 25 °C [77 °F], 100 kPa). verify (what is ?) Infobox references

Sodium fluoride (NaF) is an inorganic compound with the formula NaF. It is a colorless or white solid that is readily soluble in water. It is used in trace amounts in the fluoridation of drinking water to prevent tooth decay, and in toothpastes and topical pharmaceuticals for the same purpose. In 2023, it was the 264th most commonly prescribed medication in the United States, with more than 1 million prescriptions. It is also used in metallurgy and in medical imaging.

== Uses ==
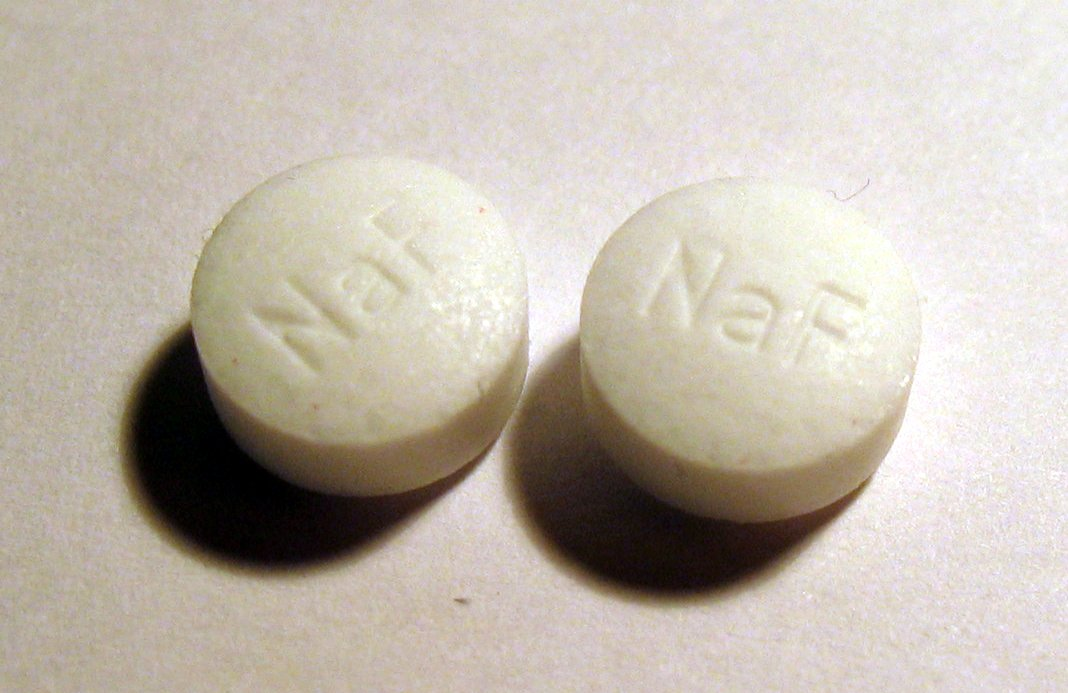
Sodium fluoride is sold in tablets for cavity prevention

=== Dental caries ===
Effect of fluoridation on hydroxyapatite in tooth enamel

Fluoride salts are often added to municipal drinking water (as well as to certain food products in some countries) for the purpose of maintaining dental health. The fluoride enhances the strength of teeth by the formation of fluorapatite, a naturally occurring component of tooth enamel. Although sodium fluoride is used to fluoridate water and is the standard by which other water-fluoridation compounds are gauged, hexafluorosilicic acid (H_{2}SiF_{6}) and its salt sodium hexafluorosilicate (Na_{2}SiF_{6}) are more commonly used additives in the United States.

=== Osteoporosis ===
Fluoride supplementation has been extensively studied for the treatment of postmenopausal osteoporosis. This supplementation does not appear to be effective; even though sodium fluoride increases bone density, it does not decrease the risk of fractures.

=== Medical imaging ===
In medical imaging, fluorine-18-labelled sodium fluoride (USP, sodium fluoride Na^{18}F) is one of the oldest tracers used in positron emission tomography (PET), having been in use since the 1960s. Relative to conventional bone scintigraphy carried out with gamma cameras or SPECT systems, PET offers more sensitivity and spatial resolution. Fluorine-18 has a half-life of 110 min, which requires it to be used promptly once produced; this logistical limitation hampered its adoption in the face of the more convenient technetium-99m-labelled radiopharmaceuticals. However, fluorine-18 is generally considered to be a superior radiopharmaceutical for skeletal imaging. In particular it has a high and rapid bone uptake accompanied by very rapid blood clearance, which results in a high bone-to-background ratio in a short time. Additionally the annihilation photons produced by decay of ^{18}F have a high energy of 511 keV compared to the 140 keV photons of ^{99m}Tc.

=== Chemistry ===
Sodium fluoride has a variety of specialty chemical applications in synthesis and extractive metallurgy. It reacts with electrophilic chlorides including acyl chlorides, sulfur chlorides, and phosphorus chloride. Like other fluorides, sodium fluoride finds use in desilylation in organic synthesis. Sodium fluoride can be used to produce fluorocarbons via the Finkelstein reaction; this process has the advantage of being simple to perform on a small scale but is rarely used on an industrial scale due to the existence of more effective techniques (e.g. Electrofluorination, Fowler process).

=== Biology ===
Sodium fluoride is sometimes added at relatively high concentrations (~20 mM) to protein lysis buffers in order to inhibit endogenous phosphatases and thereby protect phosphorylated protein sites. Sodium pyrophosphate and Sodium orthovanadate are also used for this purpose.

=== Insecticide ===
Inorganic fluorides such as fluorosilicates and sodium fluoride complex magnesium ions as magnesium fluorophosphate. They inhibit enzymes that require Mg^{2+} as a prosthetic group. In cases of fluoride poisoning, phosphate transfer in oxidative metabolism is prevented. Sodium fluoride, patented as an insecticide in 1896, was commonly used through the 1970s on ants and other domestic pests, and as a stomach poison for plant-feeding insects.

Its use, along with that of sodium fluorosilicate, declined over the 20th century as the products were banned or restricted due to the possibility of poisoning, intentional or accidental. In 1942, for instance, 47 inmates at the Oregon State Hospital died after consuming scrambled eggs which had been inadvertently prepared with sodium fluoride; while assisting the cooks, another inmate had confused a container of insecticide—used by the hospital to control cockroaches—with powdered milk, which was stored nearby.

=== Other uses ===
Sodium fluoride is used as a cleaning agent (e.g., as a "laundry sour").

Sodium fluoride can be used in a nuclear molten-salt reactor, which sodium fluoride is used as the reactor's coolant.

== Safety ==
The lethal dose for a 70 kg (154 lb) human is estimated at 5–10 g.

Fluorides, especially aqueous solutions of sodium fluoride, are quickly absorbed by the human body. They interfere with electron transport and calcium metabolism, which the human body needs to maintain cardiac membrane potentials and regulate coagulation. Fluorides irritate the eyes, skin, and nasal membranes, and chronic over-absorption can cause build up on teeth, calcification of ligaments, and hardening of bones. High ingestion of fluoride salts or hydrofluoric acid may result in fatal arrhythmias caused by hypocalcemia.

Sodium fluoride is classed as toxic by both inhalation (of dusts or aerosols) and ingestion. In high enough doses, it has been shown to affect the heart and circulatory system. For occupational exposures, the Occupational Safety and Health Administration and the National Institute for Occupational Safety and Health have established occupational exposure limits at 2.5 mg/m^{3} over an eight-hour time-weighted average.

In the higher doses used to treat osteoporosis, plain sodium fluoride can cause pain in the legs and incomplete stress fractures when the doses are too high; it also irritates the stomach, sometimes so severely as to cause peptic ulcer disease. Slow-release and enteric-coated versions of sodium fluoride do not have significant gastric side effects, and have milder and less frequent complications in the bones. In the lower doses used for water fluoridation, the only clear adverse effect is dental fluorosis, which can alter the appearance of children's teeth during tooth development. A chronic fluoride ingestion of 1 ppm of fluoride in drinking water can cause mottling of the teeth (fluorosis) and an exposure of 1.7 ppm will produce mottling in 30%–50% of patients. Studies have shown that dental fluorosis negatively impacts the self-esteem and self-image of adolescents.

== Chemical structure ==
Sodium fluoride is an inorganic ionic compound, dissolving in water to give separated Na^{+} and F^{−} ions. Like sodium chloride, it crystallizes in a cubic motif where both Na^{+} and F^{−} occupy octahedral coordination sites; its lattice spacing, approximately 462 pm, is smaller than that of sodium chloride (564 pm).

== Occurrence ==
The mineral form of NaF, villiaumite, is moderately rare. It is known from plutonic nepheline syenite rocks.

== Production ==
NaF is prepared by neutralizing hydrofluoric acid or hexafluorosilicic acid (H_{2}SiF_{6}), both byproducts of the reaction of fluorapatite (Ca_{5}(PO_{4})_{3}F) from phosphate rock during the production of superphosphate fertilizer. Neutralizing agents include sodium hydroxide and sodium carbonate. Alcohols are sometimes used to precipitate the NaF:

HF + NaOH → NaF + H_{2}O

From solutions containing HF, sodium fluoride precipitates as the bifluoride salt sodium bifluoride (NaHF_{2}). Heating the latter releases HF and gives NaF.

HF + NaF ⇌ NaHF_{2}

In a 1986 report, the annual worldwide consumption of NaF was estimated to be several million tonnes.
