= KSF =

KSF may refer to:

- Kassel Airport, IATA code
- Key shock factor, a "shock factor value" for assessing the damages that may be caused by a torpedo explosion
- Key success factor
- Kjøbenhavns Skøjteløberforening
- Kosovo Security Force
- Potassium fluorosilicate (K_{2}[SiF_{6}]), specifically when referring to KSF phosphors used in warmer white LED with improved red band emission
