= Laundry sour =

Chemical agent used in washing machines

A laundry sour is a chemical added to clothing during the final rinse cycle of a washing machine to lower the pH of the water and to assist with the removal of detergent, rust and/or mineral residues clinging to fabrics. Most such sours are fluoride-based, including ammonium fluorosilicate, ammonium bifluoride, and hexafluorosilicic acid; glycolic acid is also used. The US Department of Defense recognizes two "types" of laundry sours: type I is Sodium fluorosilicate and sodium bifluoride in powdered, crystal, or flake form; type II is ammonium bifluoride in flake form.
