= Ammonium fluorosilicate =

Chemical compound

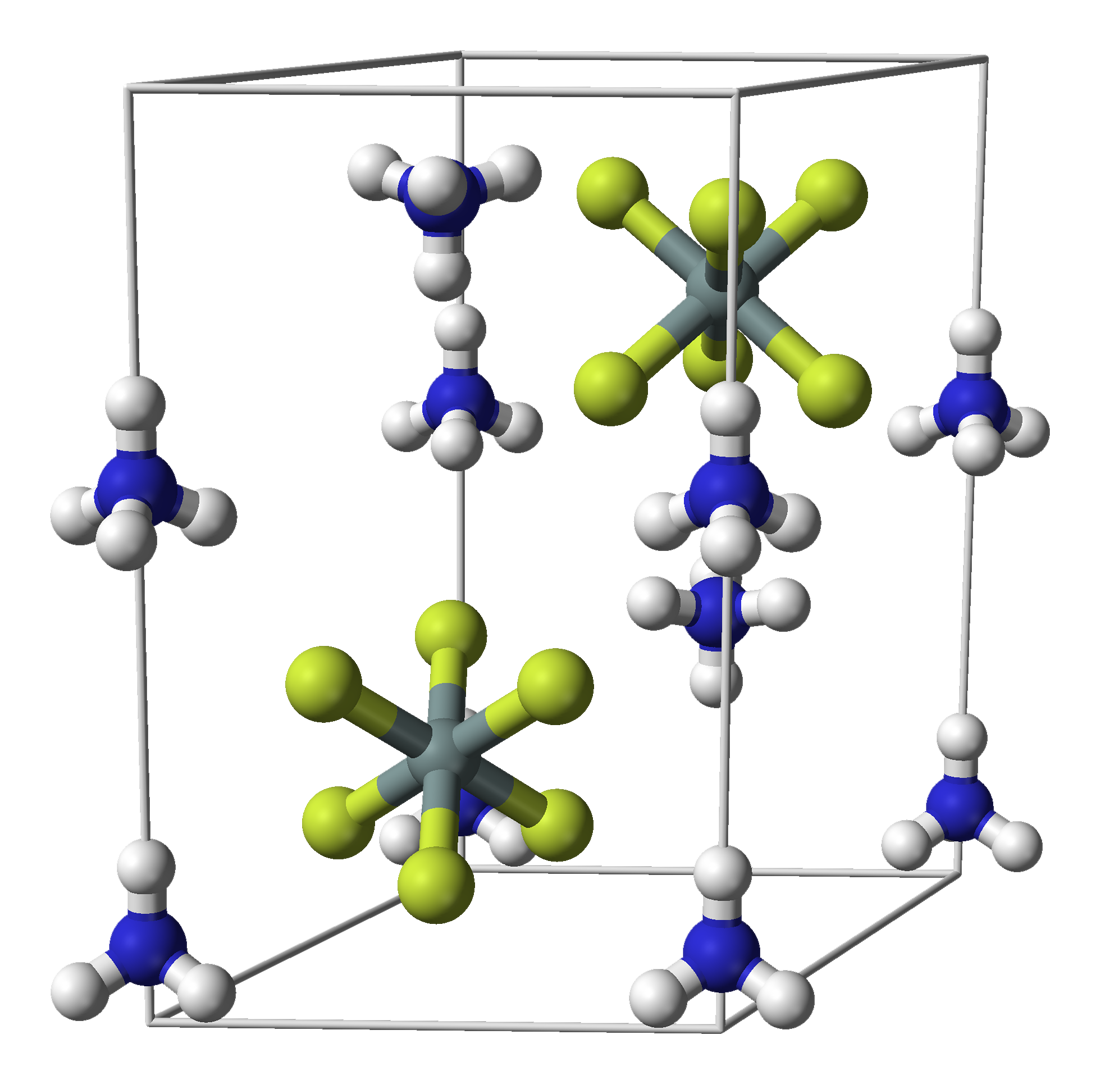

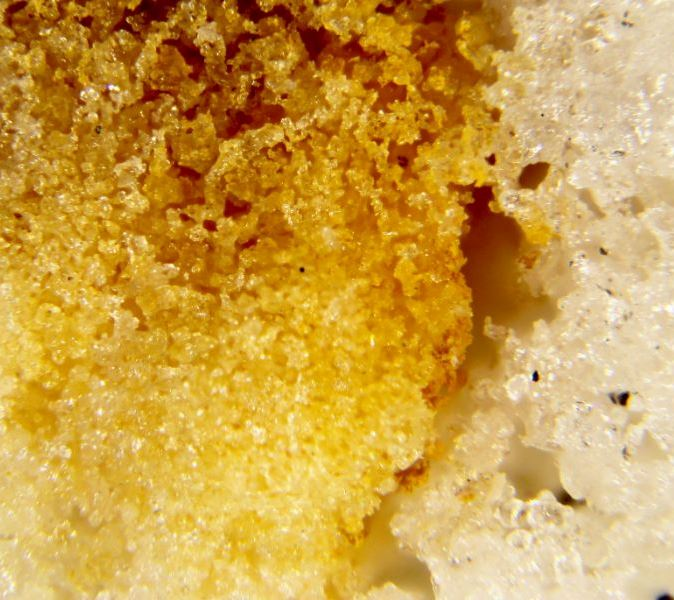

Names
- IUPAC name Ammonium hexafluorosilicate
- Other names Ammonium fluorosilicate Ammonium fluosilicate Ammonium silicofluoride

Identifiers
CAS Number	16919-19-0
3D model (JSmol)	Interactive image; Interactive image
ChemSpider	26182
ECHA InfoCard	100.037.229
EC Number	240-968-3
PubChem CID	28145
RTECS number	VV7800000
UNII	1X545W620G
UN number	2854
CompTox Dashboard (EPA)	DTXSID6047076
- InChI: InChI=1S/F6Si.2H3N/c1-7(2,3,4,5)6;;/h;2*1H3/q-2;;/p+2 Key: ITHIMUMYFVCXSL-UHFFFAOYSA-P; InChI=1/F6Si.2H3N/c1-7(2,3,4,5)6;;/h;2*1H3/q-2;;/p+2 Key: ITHIMUMYFVCXSL-SKRXCDHZAK
- SMILES: F[Si-2](F)(F)(F)(F)F.[NH4+].[NH4+]; [NH4+].[NH4+].F[Si--](F)(F)(F)(F)F

Properties
Chemical formula	(NH_{4})_{2}[SiF_{6}]
Appearance	White crystals
Density	2.0 g cm^{−3}
Melting point	100 °C (212 °F; 373 K) (decomposes)
Solubility	dissolves in water and alcohol

Related compounds
Other cations	Hexafluorosilicic acid Sodium fluorosilicate

Hazards
- GHS labelling
Pictograms	
Signal word	Danger
Hazard statements	H301, H311, H315, H319, H331, H335, H372
Precautionary statements	P260, P264, P270, P271, P280, P301+P310, P302+P352, P304+P340, P305+P351+P338, P312, P314, P321, P330, P332+P313, P337+P313, P362, P403+P233, P405, P501
NFPA 704 (fire diamond)	3 0 0 ACID
Safety data sheet (SDS)	ChemicalBook MSDS
- Except where otherwise noted, data are given for materials in their standard state (at 25 °C [77 °F], 100 kPa). verify (what is ?) Infobox references

Ammonium fluorosilicate (also known as ammonium hexafluorosilicate, ammonium fluosilicate or ammonium silicofluoride) has the formula (NH_{4})_{2}SiF_{6}. It is a toxic chemical, like all salts of fluorosilicic acid. It is made of white crystals, which have at least three polymorphs and appears in nature as rare minerals cryptohalite or bararite.

== Structure ==
Ammonium fluorosilicate has three major polymorphs: α-(NH_{4})_{2}[SiF_{6}] form is cubic (space group Fm3̅m, No. 225) and corresponds to the mineral cryptohalite. The β form is trigonal (scalenohedral) and occurs in nature as mineral bararite. A third (γ) form was discovered in 2001 and identified with the hexagonal 6mm symmetry. In all three configurations, the [SiF_{6}]^{2−} octahedra are arranged in layers. In the α form, these layers are perpendicular to [111] directions. In the β- and γ- forms, the layers are perpendicular to the c-axis. (Note: trigonal symmetry is part of the hexagonal group, but not all hexagonal crystals are trigonal.) The silicon atoms of α-(NH_{4})_{2}[SiF_{6}] (alpha), have cubic close packing (CCP). The γ form has hexagonal close packing and the β-(NH_{4})_{2}[SiF_{6}] has primitive hexagonal packing. In all three phases, 12 fluorine atoms neighbor the (NH_{4})^{+}.

Although bararite was claimed to be metastable at room temperature, it does not appear one polymorph has ever turned into another. Still, bararite is fragile enough that grinding it for spectroscopy will produce a little cryptohalite. Even so, ammonium fluorosilicate assumes a trigonal form at pressures of 0.2 to 0.3 GPa. The reaction is irreversible. If it is not bararite, the phase is at least very closely related.

The hydrogen bonding in (NH_{4})_{2}[SiF_{6}] allows this salt to change phases in ways that normal salts cannot. Interactions between cations and anions are especially important in how ammonium salts change phase. (To learn more about the β-structure, see Bararite.)

== Natural occurrence ==
This chemical makes rare appearances in nature. It is found as a sublimation product of fumaroles and coal fires. As a mineral, it is either called cryptohalite or bararite, the two being two polymorphs of the compound.

== Chemical properties and health hazards ==
Ammonium fluorosilicate is noncombustible, but it will still release dangerous fumes in a fire, including hydrogen fluoride, silicon tetrafluoride, and nitrogen oxides. It will corrode aluminium. In water, ammonium fluorosilicate dissolves to form an acid solution.

Inhaling dust can lead to pulmonary irritation, possibly death. Ingestion may also prove fatal. Irritation of the eyes comes from contact with the dust, as well as irritation or ulceration of the skin.

== Uses ==
Ammonium fluorosilicate finds use as a disinfectant, and it is useful in etching glass, metal casting, and electroplating. It is also used to help neutralize washing machine water as laundry sour.

== See also ==
- Hexafluorosilicic acid
- Sodium fluorosilicate
