= Libration (molecule) =

Slight rocking motion of an object

A diatomic molecule experiencing libration.

Libration (from the Latin verb librare "to balance, to sway"; cf. libra "scales") is a type of reciprocating motion in which an object with a nearly fixed orientation repeatedly rotates slightly back and forth. In physics and chemistry, a molecule (or other group of atoms) can undergo libration if it is subject to external forces or constraints that restrict its orientation.

For example, in liquid water, any given water molecule is attracted to neighboring molecules, so that it has a preferred orientation and cannot freely rotate. (Of course, over time, the neighboring molecules move around and the preferred orientation changes.) However, it can undergo librational motions, which are measureable in an infrared absorption spectrum and contribute to motional narrowing of other peaks, for instance the OH stretch.

Another example is a molecular crystal: Each molecular unit has a preferred orientation due to interactions with the nearby molecules, but they have librational modes corresponding to small rotations about this preferred orientation.
