= Silicon tetrafluoride =

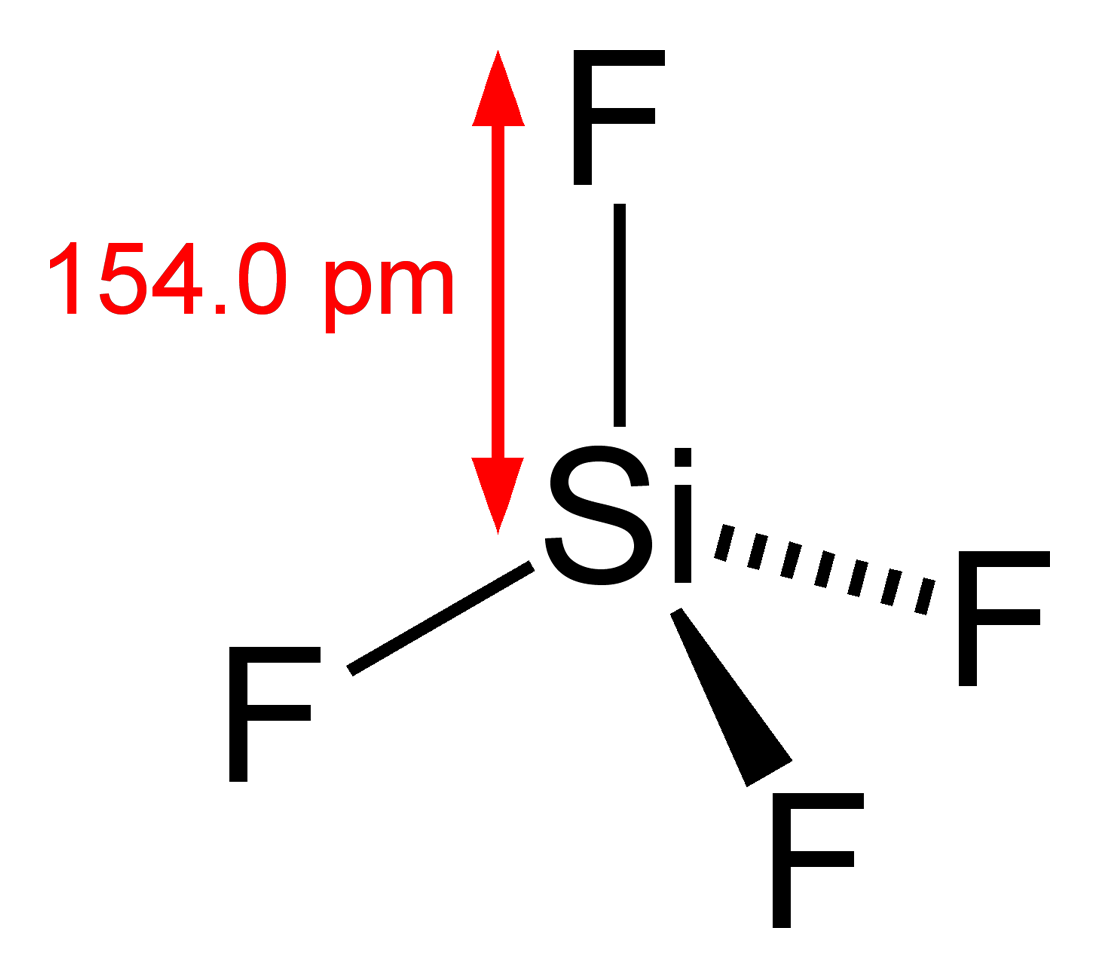
- Silicon tetrafluoride

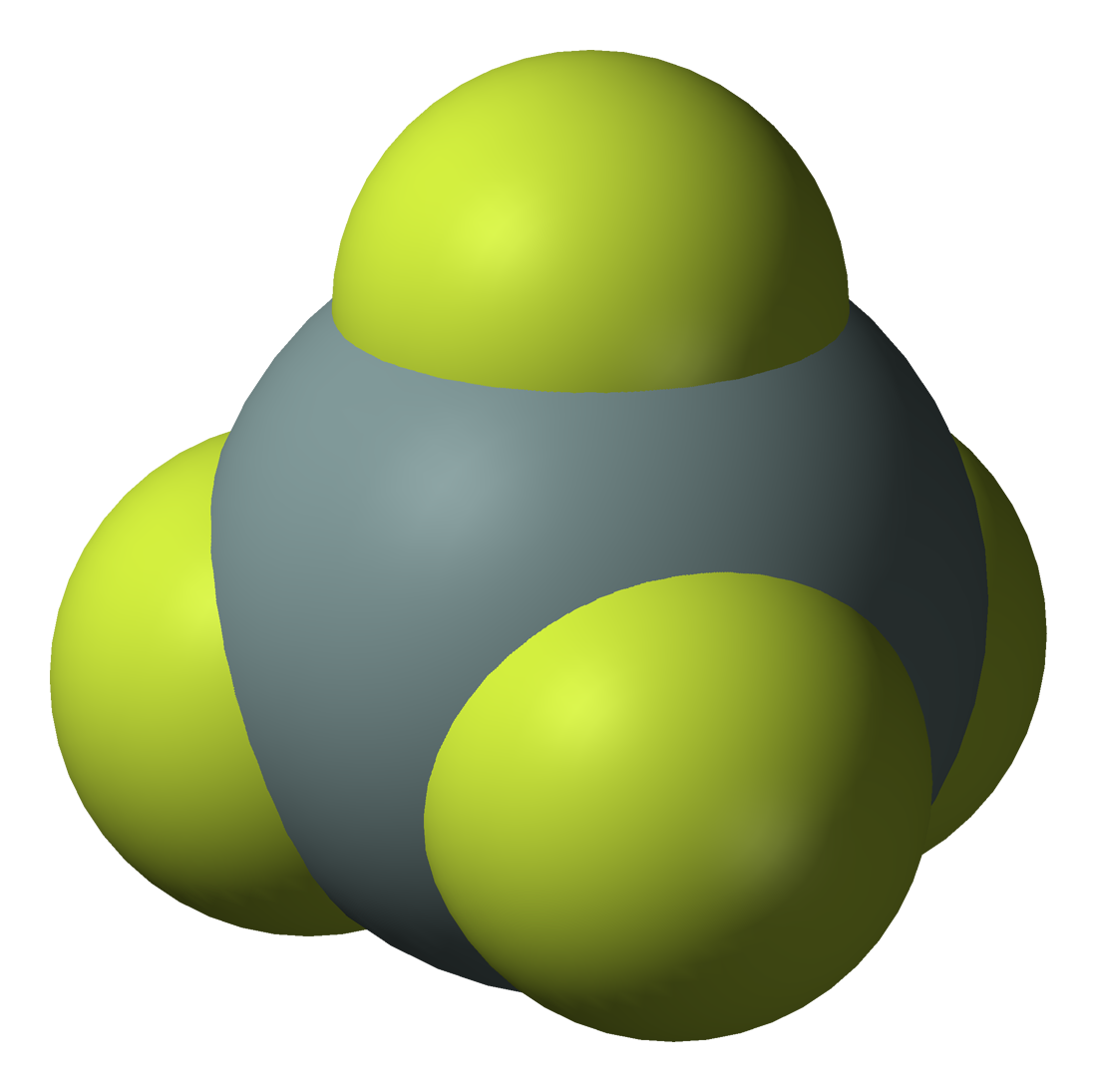
- Silicon tetrafluoride

Names
- IUPAC names Tetrafluorosilane; Silicon tetrafluoride
- Other names Silicon fluoride Fluoro acid air

Identifiers
CAS Number	7783-61-1
3D model (JSmol)	Interactive image
ChemSpider	22962
ECHA InfoCard	100.029.104
EC Number	232-015-5
PubChem CID	24556
RTECS number	VW2327000
UNII	K60VCI56YO
UN number	1859
CompTox Dashboard (EPA)	DTXSID0064830
- InChI: InChI=1S/F4Si/c1-5(2,3)4 Key: ABTOQLMXBSRXSM-UHFFFAOYSA-N
- SMILES: F[Si](F)(F)F

Properties
Chemical formula	SiF_{4}
Molar mass	104.0791 g/mol
Appearance	colourless gas, fumes in moist air
Density	1.66 g/cm^{3}, solid (−95 °C); 4.69 g/L (gas)
Melting point	−95.0 °C (−139.0 °F; 178.2 K)
Boiling point	−90.3 °C (−130.5 °F; 182.8 K)
Critical point (T, P)	−14.15 °C (6.5 °F; 259.0 K), 36.71 standard atmospheres (3,719.6 kPa; 539.5 psi)
Solubility in water	decomposes

Structure
Molecular shape	tetrahedral
Dipole moment	0 D

Hazards
- Occupational safety and health (OHS/OSH)
Main hazards	toxic, corrosive
- GHS labelling
Pictograms	(GHS04: Compressed Gas) (GHS05: Corrosive) (GHS06: Toxic)
Signal word	Danger
Hazard statements	H280, H300, H310, H314, H330, H331
Precautionary statements	P260, P262, P264, P270, P271, P280, P284, P301+P316, P301+P330+P331, P302+P352, P302+P361+P354, P304+P340, P305+P354+P338, P316, P320, P321, P330, P361+P364, P363, P403+P233, P405, P410+P403, P501
NFPA 704 (fire diamond)	3 0 2 W
- Lethal dose or concentration (LD, LC)
LC_{Lo} (lowest published)	69.220 mg/m^{3} (rat, 4 hr)
Safety data sheet (SDS)	ICSC 0576

Related compounds
Other anions	Silicon tetrachloride Silicon tetrabromide Silicon tetraiodide
Other cations	Carbon tetrafluoride Germanium tetrafluoride Tin tetrafluoride Lead tetrafluoride
Related compounds	Hexafluorosilicic acid
- Except where otherwise noted, data are given for materials in their standard state (at 25 °C [77 °F], 100 kPa). verify (what is ?) Infobox references

Silicon tetrafluoride or tetrafluorosilane is a chemical compound with the formula SiF_{4}. This colorless gas is notable for having a narrow liquid range: its boiling point is only 4 °C above its melting point. It was first prepared in 1771 by Carl Wilhelm Scheele by dissolving silica in hydrofluoric acid, and later synthesized by John Davy in 1812. It is a tetrahedral molecule and is corrosive.

== Occurrence ==
Volcanic plumes contain significant amounts of silicon tetrafluoride. Production can reach several tonnes per day. Some amounts are also emitted from spontaneous coal fires. The silicon tetrafluoride is partly hydrolysed and forms hexafluorosilicic acid.

== Preparation ==
SiF_{4} is a by-product of the production of phosphate fertilizers wet process production, resulting from the attack of HF (derived from fluorapatite protonolysis) on silicates, which are present as impurities in the phosphate rocks. The hydrofluoric acid and silicon dioxide (SiO_{2}) react to produce hexafluorosilicic acid:

6 HF + SiO_{2} → H_{2}SiF_{6} + 2 H_{2}O

In the laboratory, the compound is prepared by heating barium hexafluorosilicate (Ba[SiF_{6}]) above 300 °C (572 °F) whereupon the solid releases volatile SiF_{4}, leaving a residue of BaF_{2}.

Ba[SiF_{6}] + 400°C → BaF_{2} + SiF_{4}

Alternatively, sodium hexafluorosilicate (Na_{2}[SiF_{6}]) may also be thermally decomposed at 400 °C (752 °F)—600 °C (1,112 °F) (optionally in inert nitrogen gas atmosphere)

Na_{2}[SiF_{6}] + 400°C → 2NaF + SiF_{4}

== Uses ==
This volatile compound finds limited use in microelectronics and organic synthesis.

It is also used in production of fluorosilicic acid (see above).

In the 1980s, as part of the Low-Cost Solar Array Project by Jet Propulsion Laboratory, it was investigated as a potentially cheap feedstock for polycrystalline silicon production in fluidized bed reactors. Few methods using it for the said production process were patented.

=== The Ethyl Corporation process ===
In the 1980s the Ethyl Corporation came up with a process that uses hexafluorosilicic acid and sodium aluminium hydride (NaAlH_{4}) (or other alkali metal hydride) to produce silane (SiH_{4}).

== Safety ==
In 2001 it was listed by New Jersey authorities as a hazardous substance that is corrosive and may severely irritate or even burn skin and eyes. It is fatal if inhaled.

== See also ==
- SiH_{4} (silane)
- Hexafluorosilicic acid
