= Potassium fluorosilicate =

Phosphor with improved red band emission used in warmer white LED

Names
- Preferred IUPAC name Potassium fluorosilicate
- Other names Potassium hexafluorosilicate(IV)

Identifiers
CAS Number	16871-90-2
3D model (JSmol)	Interactive image
ChemSpider	55723
ECHA InfoCard	100.037.163
EC Number	240-896-2
PubChem CID	61851
RTECS number	VV8400000
UNII	2610W49XYD
UN number	2655
CompTox Dashboard (EPA)	DTXSID10884939
- InChI: InChI=1S/F6Si.2K/c1-7(2,3,4,5)6;;/q-2;2*+1 Key: UUHPPUWEDCVPCO-UHFFFAOYSA-N
- SMILES: F[Si-2](F)(F)(F)(F)F.[K+].[K+]

Properties
Chemical formula	K_{2}[SiF_{6}]
Molar mass	220.28 g·mol^{−1}
Density	2.27 g·cm^{−3}, 2.719 g·cm^{−3}
Solubility in water	Slightly soluble in water

Structure
Crystal structure	cubic
Space group	Fm3̅m
Lattice constant	a = 0.8134 nm
Lattice volume (V)	0.538.2 nm^{3}
Formula units (Z)	4

Hazards
- GHS labelling
Pictograms	(GHS06: Toxic)
Signal word	Danger
Hazard statements	H301, H311, H331
Precautionary statements	P261, P264, P270, P271, P280, P301+P310, P302+P352, P304+P340, P311, P312, P321, P322, P330, P361, P363, P403+P233, P405, P501

Related compounds
Other cations	Ammonium hexafluorosilicate Sodium fluorosilicate Fluorosilicic acid
- Except where otherwise noted, data are given for materials in their standard state (at 25 °C [77 °F], 100 kPa). Infobox references

Potassium fluorosilicate is a chemical compound with the chemical formula K_{2}[SiF_{6}].

When doped with potassium hexafluoromanganate(IV) (K_{2}[MnF_{6}], with Mn^{4+}) it forms a narrow band red producing phosphor, (often abbreviated PSF or KSF), of economic interest due to its applicability in LED lighting and displays.

== Natural occurrence ==
Occurs naturally as hiereatite, found in the Aeolian islands (Sicily, Italy). A hexagonal form demartinite has also been found at the rim of volcanic fumaroles in the same islands.

The sea sponge Halichondria Moorei builds a skeleton of potassium fluorosilicate.

== Structure and properties ==
According to analysis by Loehlin (1984), it has space group Fm3̅m, with a_{0} = 0.8134 nm, V = 0.538.2 nm^{3} at 295 K. The Si-F bond length is 0.1683 nm. At high temperatures and pressures -beta and -gamma phases exist.

== Applications ==
Potassium fluorosilicate has applications in porcelain manufacture, the preservation of timber, aluminium and magnesium smelting, and the manufacture of optical glass.

=== Red phosphor ===
When doped with potassium hexafluoromanganate(IV) (K_{2}[MnF_{6}]), a narrow band red phosphor is produced, emitting at around 630 nm. This substance has application improving the white light quality of white LEDs that use a blue emitting LED in combination with the yellow cerium doped yttrium aluminium garnet phosphor (YAG), Y_{3}Al_{5}O_{12}:Ce^{3+}.

Synthesis routes to the phosphor include co-crystallisation and co-precipitation. For example, K_{2}[MnF_{6}] in (40%) hydrofluoric acid with potassium fluoride can be mixed with SiO_{2} dissolved in (40%) hydrofluoric acid to co-precipitate the phosphor.

The acronyms KSF or PSF are used for potassium fluorosilicate phosphors.

== See also ==
- Fluorosilicic acid
- Ammonium fluorosilicate
- Sodium fluorosilicate
