= Hexafluorosilicic acid =

Octahedric silicon compound

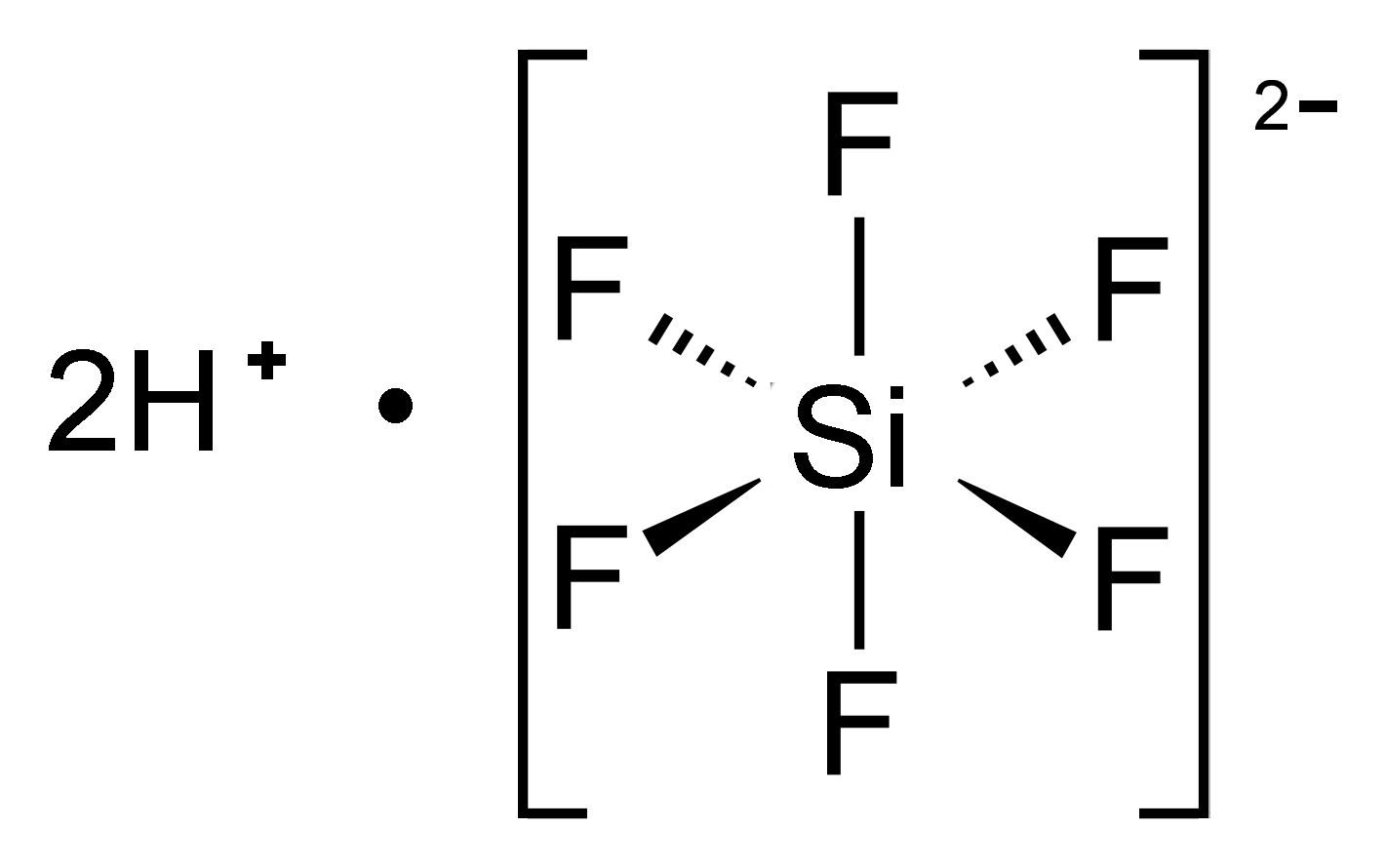

Names
- Preferred IUPAC name Hexafluorosilicic acid
- Systematic IUPAC name Dihydrogen hexafluorosilicate
- Other names Fluorosilicic acid, fluosilic acid, hydrofluorosilicic acid, silicofluoride, silicofluoric acid, oxonium hexafluorosilanediuide, oxonium hexafluoridosilicate(2−)

Identifiers
| CAS Number | 16961-83-4 |
| 3D model (JSmol) | Interactive image; Interactive image |
| ChemSpider | 17215660 |
| ECHA InfoCard | 100.037.289 |
| EC Number | 241-034-8 |
| PubChem CID | 21863527 |
| RTECS number | VV8225000 |
| UNII | 53V4OQG6U1 |
| UN number | 1778 |
| CompTox Dashboard (EPA) | DTXSID2029741 |
- InChI: InChI=1S/F6Si/c1-7(2,3,4,5)6/q-2/p+2 Key: OHORFAFFMDIQRR-UHFFFAOYSA-P; InChI=1/F6Si/c1-7(2,3,4,5)6/q-2/p+2 Key: OHORFAFFMDIQRR-SKRXCDHZAM
- SMILES: [H+].[H+].F[Si-2](F)(F)(F)(F)F; [H+].[H+].F[Si--](F)(F)(F)(F)F

Properties
| Chemical formula | F_{6}H_{2}Si |
| Molar mass | 144.091 g·mol^{−1} |
| Appearance | transparent, colorless, fuming liquid |
| Odor | sour, pungent |
| Density | 1.22 g/cm^{3} (25% soln.); 1.38 g/cm^{3} (35% soln.); 1.46 g/cm^{3} (61% soln.) |
| Melting point | c. 19 °C (66 °F; 292 K) (60–70% solution) < −30 °C (−22 °F; 243 K) (35% solution) |
| Boiling point | 108.5 °C (227.3 °F; 381.6 K) (decomposes) |
| Solubility in water | miscible |
| Acidity (pK_{a}) | pK_{a1} < 0 pK_{a2} = 1.83 or 0.65 |
| Refractive index (n_{D}) | 1.3465 |

Structure
| Molecular shape | Octahedral SiF_{6}^{2−} |

Hazards
- GHS labelling
| Pictograms | (GHS05: Corrosive) (GHS06: Toxic) (GHS07: Exclamation mark) |
| Signal word | Danger |
| Hazard statements | H301+H311+H331, H314 |
| Precautionary statements | P260, P264, P270, P271, P280, P301+P330+P331, P303+P361+P353, P304+P340, P305+P351+P338, P310, P321, P363, P405, P501 |
| NFPA 704 (fire diamond) | 3 0 0 COR |
| Flash point | Non-flammable |
- Lethal dose or concentration (LD, LC)
| LD_{50} (median dose) | 430 mg/kg (oral, rat) |
| Safety data sheet (SDS) | External MSDS |

Related compounds
| Other anions | Hexafluorotitanic acid Hexafluorozirconic acid |
| Other cations | Ammonium hexafluorosilicate Sodium fluorosilicate |
| Related compounds | Hexafluorophosphoric acid Fluoroboric acid |
- Except where otherwise noted, data are given for materials in their standard state (at 25 °C [77 °F], 100 kPa). verify (what is ?) Infobox references

Hexafluorosilicic acid is an inorganic compound with the chemical formula H_{2}SiF_{6}. Aqueous solutions of hexafluorosilicic acid consist of salts of the cation and hexafluorosilicate anion. These salts and their aqueous solutions are colorless.

Hexafluorosilicic acid is produced naturally on a large scale in volcanoes. It is manufactured as a coproduct in the production of phosphate fertilizers. The resulting hexafluorosilicic acid is almost exclusively consumed as a precursor to aluminum trifluoride and synthetic cryolite, which are used in aluminium processing. Salts derived from hexafluorosilicic acid are called hexafluorosilicates.

== Structure ==
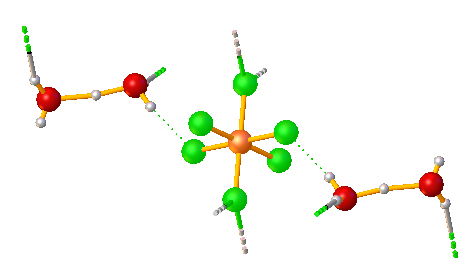
Structure of (H_{5}O_{2})_{2}SiF_{6}. The hydrogen bonding between the fluoride and protons are indicated by dashed lines. Color code: green = F, orange = Si, red = O, gray = H.

Hexafluorosilicic acid has been crystallized as various hydrates. These include (H_{5}O_{2})_{2}SiF_{6}, the more complicated (H_{5}O_{2})_{2}SiF_{6}·2H_{2}O, and (H_{5}O_{2})(H_{7}O_{3})SiF_{6}·4.5H_{2}O. In all of these salts, the octahedral hexafluorosilicate anion is hydrogen bonded to the cations.

Aqueous solutions of hexafluorosilicic acid are often described as H_{2}SiF_{6}, but the main fluoride-containing species in such solutions are SiF_{6}]^{2−} and various products from hydrolysis such as F^{-}.

== Production and principal reactions ==
Hexafluorosilicic acid is produced commercially from fluoride-containing minerals that also contain silicates. Specifically, apatite and fluorapatite are treated with sulfuric acid to give phosphoric acid, a precursor to several water-soluble fertilizers. This is called the wet phosphoric acid process. As a by-product, approximately 50 kg of hexafluorosilicic acid is produced per tonne of HF owing to reactions involving silica-containing mineral impurities.

Some of the hydrogen fluoride (HF) produced during this process in turn reacts with silicon dioxide (SiO_{2}) impurities, which are unavoidable constituents of the mineral feedstock, to give silicon tetrafluoride. Thus formed, the silicon tetrafluoride reacts further with HF. The net process can be described as:

6 HF + SiO_{2} → SiF^{2−}_{6} + 2 H_{3}O^{+}

Hexafluorosilicic acid can also be produced by treating silicon tetrafluoride with hydrofluoric acid.

== Reactions ==
Hexafluorosilicic acid is a strong acid, similar to sulfuric acid. However, the second deprotonation can be quantified, but here differing values were reported (pK_{2} = 0.65 or pK_{2} = 1.83).

Hexafluorosilic acid is only stable in hydrogen fluoride or acidic aqueous solutions. In any other circumstance, it acts as a source of hydrofluoric acid. Thus, for example, hexafluorosilicic acid pure or in oleum solution evolves silicon tetrafluoride until the residual hydrogen fluoride re-establishes equilibrium:

H_{2}SiF_{6} ⇌ 2 HF(l) + SiF_{4}(g)

In alkaline-to-neutral aqueous solutions, hexafluorosilicic acid readily hydrolyzes to fluoride anions and amorphous, hydrated silica ("SiO_{2}"). Strong bases give fluorosilicate salts at first, but any stoichiometric excess begins hydrolysis. At the concentrations usually used for water fluoridation, 99% hydrolysis occurs:

SiF^{2−}_{6} + 2 H_{2}O → 6 F^{−} + SiO_{2} + 4 H^{+}

=== Alkali and alkaline earth salts ===
Neutralization of solutions of hexafluorosilicic acid with alkali metal bases produces the corresponding alkali metal fluorosilicate salts:

H_{2}SiF_{6} + 2 NaOH → Na_{2}SiF_{6} + 2 H_{2}O

The resulting salt Na_{2}SiF_{6} is mainly used in water fluoridation. Related ammonium and barium salts are produced similarly for other applications. At room temperature 15–30% concentrated hexafluorosilicic acid undergoes similar reactions with chlorides, hydroxides, and carbonates of alkali and alkaline earth metals.

Sodium hexafluorosilicate for instance may be produced by treating sodium chloride (NaCl) by hexafluorosilicic acid:

2NaCl + H_{2}SiF_{6} Na_{2}SiF_{6}↓ + 2 HCl
BaCl_{2} + H_{2}SiF_{6} BaSiF_{6}↓ + 2 HCl

Heating sodium hexafluorosilicate gives silicon tetrafluoride:

Na_{2}SiF_{6} SiF_{4} + 2 NaF

== Uses ==
The majority of the hexafluorosilicic acid is converted to aluminium fluoride and synthetic cryolite. These materials are central to the conversion of aluminium ore into aluminium metal. The conversion to aluminium trifluoride is described as:

H_{2}SiF_{6} + Al_{2}O_{3} → 2 AlF_{3} + SiO_{2} + H_{2}O

Hexafluorosilicic acid is also converted to a variety of useful hexafluorosilicate salts. The potassium salt, Potassium fluorosilicate, is used in the production of porcelains, the magnesium salt for hardened concretes and as an insecticide, and the barium salts for phosphors.

Hexafluorosilicic acid and the salts are used as wood preservation agents.

=== Lead refining ===
Hexafluorosilicic acid is also used as an electrolyte in the Betts electrolytic process for refining lead.

=== Rust removers ===
Hexafluorosilicic acid (identified as hydrofluorosilicic acid on the label) along with oxalic acid are the active ingredients used in Iron Out rust-removing cleaning products, which are essentially varieties of laundry sour.

=== Niche applications ===
H_{2}SiF_{6} is a specialized reagent in organic synthesis for cleaving Si–O bonds of silyl ethers. It is more reactive for this purpose than HF. It reacts faster with t-butyldimethysilyl (TBDMS) ethers than triisopropylsilyl (TIPS) ethers.

=== Treating concrete ===
The application of hexafluorosilicic acid to a calcium-rich surface such as concrete will give that surface some resistance to acid attack.

CaCO_{3} + H_{2}O → Ca^{2+} + 2 OH^{−} + CO_{2}
H_{2}SiF_{6} → 2 H^{+} + SiF^{2−}_{6}
SiF^{2−}_{6} + 2 H_{2}O → 6 F^{−} + SiO_{2} + 4 H^{+}
Ca^{2+} + 2 F^{−} → CaF_{2}

Calcium fluoride (CaF_{2}) is an insoluble solid that is acid resistant.

== Natural salts ==
Some rare minerals, encountered either within volcanic or coal-fire fumaroles, are salts of the hexafluorosilicic acid. Examples include ammonium hexafluorosilicate that naturally occurs as two polymorphs: cryptohalite and bararite.

== Safety ==
Hexafluorosilicic acid can release hydrogen fluoride (HF) when evaporated, so it has similar risks. Inhalation of the vapors may cause lung edema. Like hydrogen fluoride, it attacks glass and stoneware. The LD_{50} value of hexafluorosilicic acid is 430 mg/kg.

== See also ==
- Ammonium fluorosilicate
- Sodium fluorosilicate
- Potassium fluorosilicate
