= Sodium fluorosilicate =

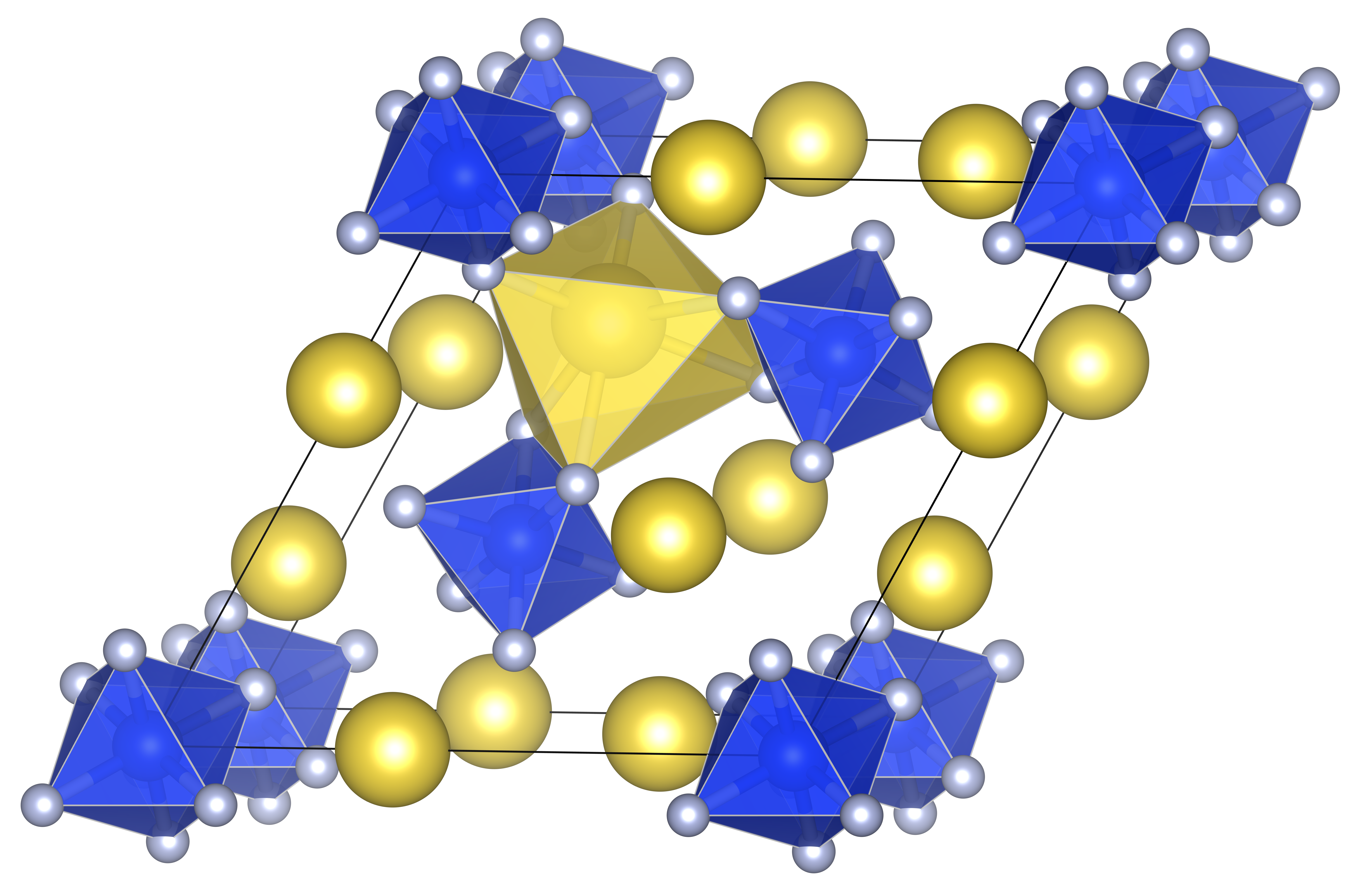
- Unit cell of sodium hexafluoridosilicate

Names
- Preferred IUPAC name Sodium fluorosilicate
- Systematic IUPAC name Sodium hexafluoridosilicate(2–)
- Other names Disodium hexafluorosilicate/sodium fluosilicate/sodium silicofluoride

Identifiers
| CAS Number | 16893-85-9 |
| 3D model (JSmol) | Interactive image |
| ChemSpider | 26165 |
| ECHA InfoCard | 100.037.198 |
| EC Number | 240-934-8 |
| PubChem CID | 28127 |
| RTECS number | VV8410000 |
| UNII | 806AV2E065 |
| UN number | 2674 |
| CompTox Dashboard (EPA) | DTXSID9036933 |
- InChI: InChI=1S/F6Si.2Na/c1-7(2,3,4,5)6;;/q-2;2*+1 Key: TWGUZEUZLCYTCG-UHFFFAOYSA-N
- SMILES: [Na+].[Na+].F[Si--](F)(F)(F)(F)F

Properties
| Chemical formula | Na_{2}[SiF_{6}] |
| Molar mass | 188 g/mol |
| Appearance | white granular powder |
| Odor | odorless |
| Density | 2.7 g/cm^{3} |
| Solubility in water | 0.64 g/100 mL (20 °C); 1.27 g/100 mL (50 °C); 2.45 g/100 mL (100 °C) |
| Solubility | insoluble in alcohol |
| Refractive index (n_{D}) | 1.312 |

Structure
| Crystal structure | trigonal |
| Space group | P321 |
| Lattice constant | a = 8.859, c = 5.038 |
| Formula units (Z) | 4 |

Hazards
| NFPA 704 (fire diamond) | 2 0 0 |
- Lethal dose or concentration (LD, LC)
| LD_{Lo} (lowest published) | 70 mg/kg (mouse, oral); 125 mg/kg (rabbit, oral) |

Related compounds
| Other cations | Ammonium hexafluorosilicate Fluorosilicic acid |
- Except where otherwise noted, data are given for materials in their standard state (at 25 °C [77 °F], 100 kPa). Infobox references

Sodium fluorosilicate is a compound with the chemical formula Na_{2}[SiF_{6}]. Unlike other sodium salts, it has a low solubility in water.

== Natural occurrence ==
Sodium hexafluorosilicate occurs naturally as the rare mineral malladrite found within some volcanic fumaroles.

== Manufacturing ==
Sodium fluorosilicate is made by neutralizing fluorosilicic acid with sodium chloride or sodium sulfate.

H_{2}[SiF_{6}] + 2 NaCl → Na_{2}[SiF_{6}] + 2 HCl

== Possible application ==
Sodium fluorosilicate is used in some countries as additives for water fluoridation, opal glass raw material, ore refining, or other fluoride chemical (like sodium fluoride, magnesium silicofluoride, cryolite, aluminum fluoride) production.

It is used for extraction of beryllium from beryl, by roasting the mineral with it at 700-750 °C, leaching the soluble fluoride with water, and then precipitating it as Be(OH)_{2} at about pH 13.

It also is an ingredient in some ceramic cements.

== See also ==
- Fluorosilicic acid
- Ammonium fluorosilicate
