= Fluorine in biology =

PET scan using fluorine-18

Fluorine may interact with biological systems in the form of fluorine-containing compounds. Though elemental fluorine (F_{2}) is very rare in everyday life, fluorine-containing compounds such as fluorite occur naturally as minerals. Naturally occurring organofluorine compounds are extremely rare. Man-made fluoride compounds are common and are used in medicines, pesticides, and materials. Twenty percent of all commercialized pharmaceuticals contain fluorine, including Lipitor and Prozac. In many contexts, fluorine-containing compounds are harmless or even beneficial to living organisms; in others, they are toxic.

Aside from their use in medicine, man-made fluorinated compounds have also played a role in several noteworthy environmental concerns. Chlorofluorocarbons (CFCs), once major components of numerous commercial aerosol products, have proven damaging to Earth's ozone layer and resulted in the wide-reaching Montreal Protocol; though in truth the chlorine in CFCs is the destructive actor, fluorine is an important part of these molecules because it makes them very stable and long-lived. Similarly, the stability of many organofluorine compounds has raised the issue of biopersistence. Long-lived molecules from waterproofing sprays, for example PFOA and PFOS, are found worldwide in the tissues of wildlife and humans, including newborn children.

Fluorine biology is also relevant to a number of cutting-edge technologies. PFCs (perfluorocarbons) are capable of holding enough oxygen to support human liquid breathing. Organofluorine in the form of its radioisotope ^{18}F is also at the heart of a modern medical imaging technique known as positron emission tomography (PET). A PET scan produces three-dimensional colored images of parts of the body that use a lot of sugar, particularly the brain or tumors.

== Dental care ==
Since the mid-20th century, it has been discerned from population studies (though incompletely understood) that fluoride reduces tooth decay. Initially, researchers hypothesized that fluoride helped by converting tooth enamel from the more acid-soluble mineral hydroxyapatite to the less acid-soluble mineral fluorapatite. However, more recent studies showed no difference in the frequency of caries (cavities) between teeth that were pre-fluoridated to different degrees. Current thinking is that fluoride prevents cavities primarily by helping teeth that are in the very early stages of tooth decay.

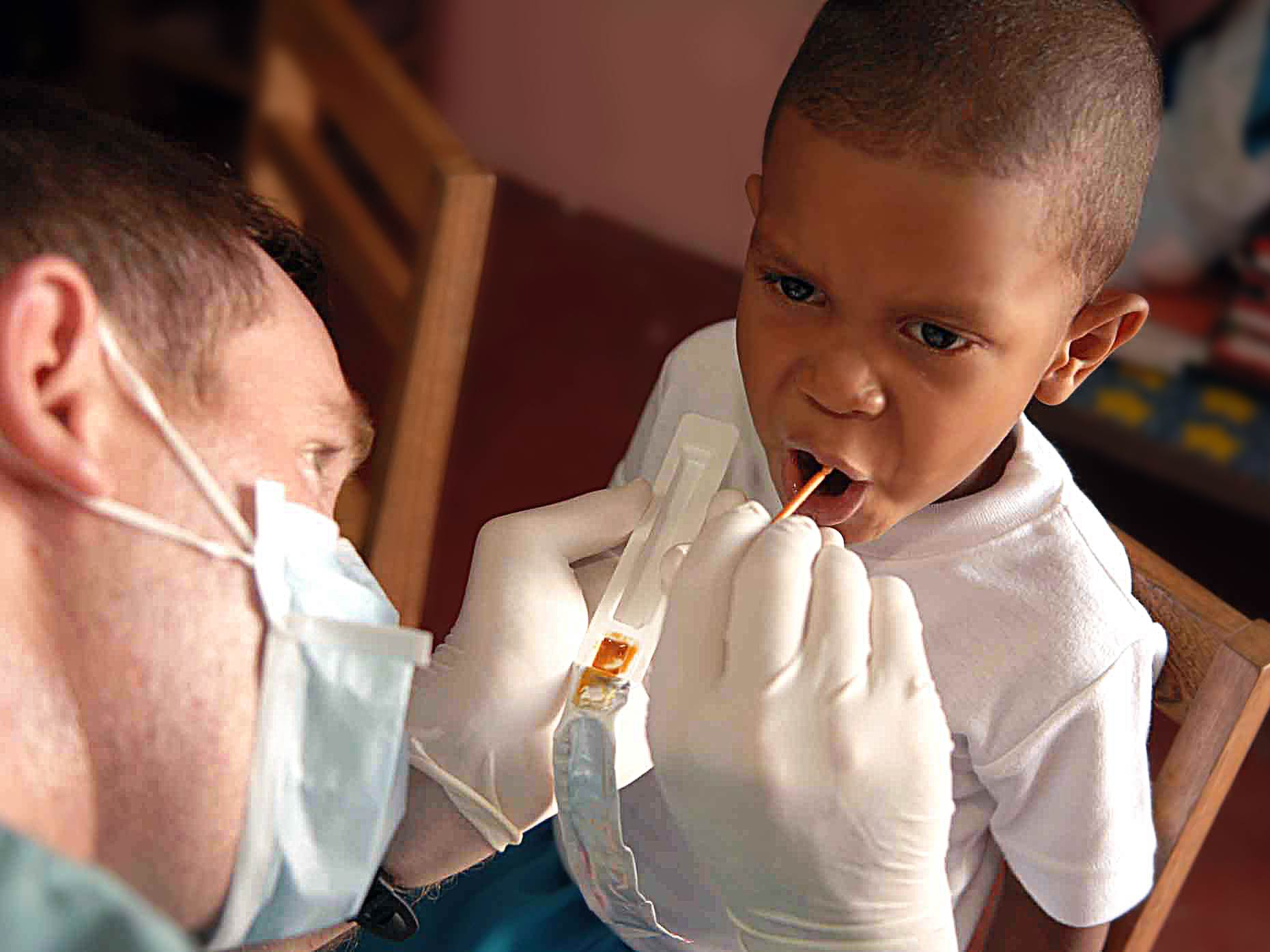
Topical fluoride treatment in Panama

When teeth begin to decay from the acid produced by sugar-consuming bacteria, calcium is lost (demineralization). However, teeth have a limited ability to recover calcium if decay is not too far advanced (remineralization). Fluoride appears to reduce demineralization and increase remineralization. Also, there is some evidence that fluoride interferes with the bacteria that consume sugars in the mouth and make tooth-destroying acids. In any case, it is only the fluoride that is directly present in the mouth (topical treatment) that prevents cavities; fluoride ions that are swallowed do not benefit the teeth.

Water fluoridation is the controlled addition of fluoride to a public water supply in an effort to reduce tooth decay in people who drink the water. Its use began in the 1940s, following studies of children in a region where water is naturally fluoridated. It is now used widely in public water systems in the United States and some other parts of the world, such that about two-thirds of the U.S. population is exposed to fluoridated water supplies and about 5.7% of people worldwide. Although the best available evidence shows no association with adverse effects other than fluorosis (dental and, in worse cases, skeletal), most of which is mild, water fluoridation has been contentious for ethical, safety, and efficacy reasons, and opposition to water fluoridation exists despite its widespread support by public health organizations. The benefits of water fluoridation have lessened recently, presumably because of the availability of fluoride in other forms, but are still measurable, particularly for low-income groups. Systematic reviews in 2000 and 2007 showed significant reduction of cavities in children exposed to water fluoridation.

Sodium fluoride, tin difluoride, and, most commonly, sodium monofluorophosphate, are used in toothpaste. In 1955, the first fluoride toothpaste was introduced in the United States. Now, almost all toothpaste in developed countries is fluoridated. For example, 95% of European toothpaste contains fluoride. Gels and foams are often advised for special patient groups, particularly those undergoing radiation therapy to the head (cancer patients). The patient receives a four-minute application of a high amount of fluoride. Varnishes, which can be more quickly applied, exist and perform a similar function. Fluoride is also often present in prescription and non-prescription mouthwashes and is a trace component of foods manufactured using fluoridated water supplies.

== Medical applications ==
=== Pharmaceuticals ===
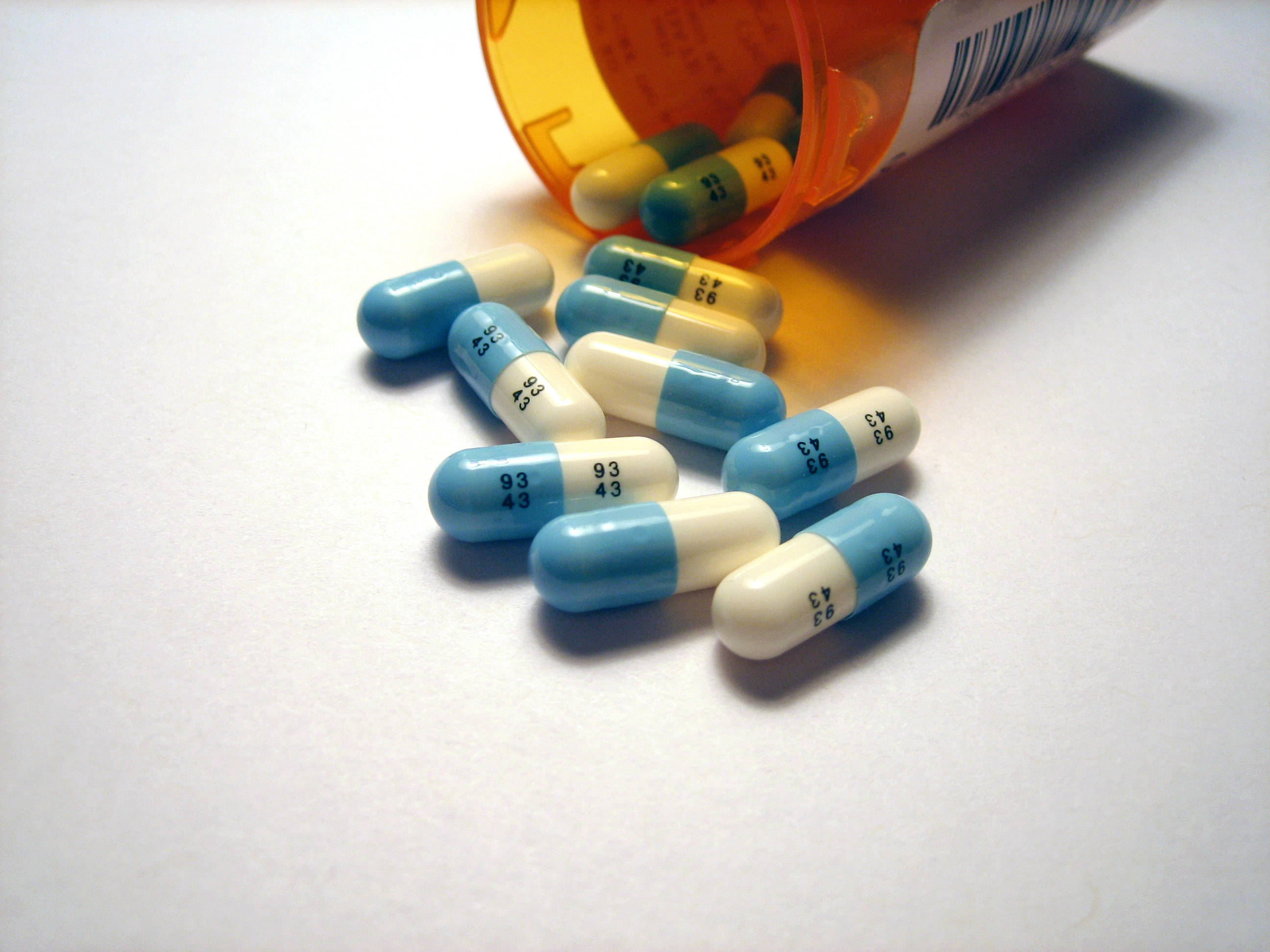
Prozac, one of several notable fluorine-containing drugs

Of all commercialized pharmaceutical drugs, twenty percent contain fluorine, including important drugs in many different pharmaceutical classes. Fluorine is often added to drug molecules during drug design, as even a single atom can greatly change the chemical properties of the molecule in desirable ways.

Because of the considerable stability of the carbon–fluorine bond, many drugs are fluorinated to delay their metabolism, which is the chemical process in which the drugs are turned into compounds that allows them to be eliminated. This prolongs their half-lives and allows for longer times between dosing and activation. For example, an aromatic ring may prevent the metabolism of a drug, but this presents a safety problem, because some aromatic compounds are metabolized in the body into poisonous epoxides by the organism's native enzymes. Substituting a fluorine into a para position, however, protects the aromatic ring and prevents the epoxide from being produced.

Adding fluorine to biologically active organic compounds increases their lipophilicity (ability to dissolve in fats), because the carbon–fluorine bond is even more hydrophobic than the carbon–hydrogen bond. This effect often increases a drug's bioavailability because of increased cell membrane penetration. Although the potential of fluorine being released in a fluoride leaving group depends on its position in the molecule, organofluorides are generally very stable, since the carbon–fluorine bond is strong.

Fluorines also find their uses in common mineralocorticoids, a class of drugs that increase the blood pressure. Adding a fluorine increases both its medical power and anti-inflammatory effects. Fluorine-containing fludrocortisone is one of the most common of these drugs. Dexamethasone and triamcinolone, which are among the most potent of the related synthetic corticosteroid class of drugs, contain fluorine as well.

Several inhaled general anesthetic agents, including the most commonly used inhaled agents, also contain fluorine. The first fluorinated anesthetic agent, halothane, proved to be much safer (neither explosive nor flammable) and longer-lasting than those previously used. Modern fluorinated anesthetics are longer-lasting still and almost insoluble in blood, which accelerates the awakening. Examples include sevoflurane, desflurane, enflurane, and isoflurane, all hydrofluorocarbon derivatives.

Prior to the 1980s, antidepressants altered not only serotonin uptake but also the uptake of altered norepinephrine; the latter caused most of the side effects of antidepressants. The first drug to alter only the serotonin uptake was Prozac; it gave birth to the extensive selective serotonin reuptake inhibitor (SSRI) antidepressant class and is the best-selling antidepressant. Many other SSRI antidepressants are fluorinated organics, including Celexa, Luvox, and Lexapro. Fluoroquinolones are a commonly used family of broad-spectrum antibiotics.

Molecular structures of several fluorine-containing pharmaceuticals
Lipitor (atorvastatin)	5-FU (fluorouracil)	Florinef (fludrocortisone)	Isoflurane

=== Scanning ===
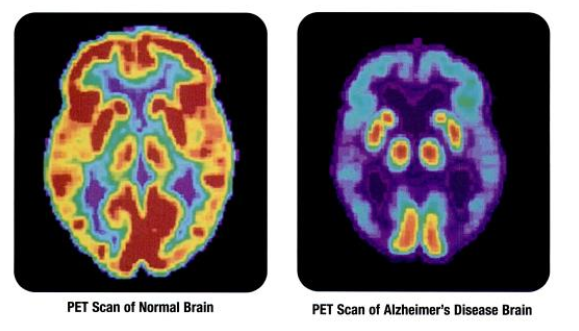
PET scan for diagnosis of Alzheimer's disease

Compounds containing fluorine-18, a radioactive isotope that emits positrons, are often used in positron emission tomography (PET) scanning, because the isotope's half-life of about 110 minutes is usefully long by positron-emitter standards. One such radiopharmaceutical is 2-deoxy-2-(^{18}F)fluoro-D-glucose (generically referred to as fludeoxyglucose), commonly abbreviated as ^{18}F-FDG, or simply FDG. In PET imaging, FDG can be used for assessing glucose metabolism in the brain and for imaging cancer tumors. After injection into the blood, FDG is taken up by "FDG-avid" tissues with a high need for glucose, such as the brain and most types of malignant tumors. Tomography, often assisted by a computer to form a PET/CT (CT stands for "computer tomography") machine, can then be used to diagnose or monitor treatment of cancers, especially Hodgkin's lymphoma, lung cancer, and breast cancer.

Natural fluorine is monoisotopic, consisting solely of fluorine-19. Fluorine compounds are highly amenable to nuclear magnetic resonance (NMR), because fluorine-19 has a nuclear spin of 1/2, a high nuclear magnetic moment, and a high magnetogyric ratio. Fluorine compounds typically have a fast NMR relaxation, which enables the use of fast averaging to obtain a signal-to-noise ratio similar to hydrogen-1 NMR spectra. Fluorine-19 is commonly used in NMR study of metabolism, protein structures and conformational changes. In addition, inert fluorinated gases have the potential to be a cheap and efficient tool for imaging lung ventilation.

=== Oxygen transport research ===
Liquid fluorocarbons have a very high capacity for holding gas in solution. They can hold more oxygen or carbon dioxide than blood does. For that reason, they have attracted ongoing interest related to the possibility of artificial blood or of liquid breathing.

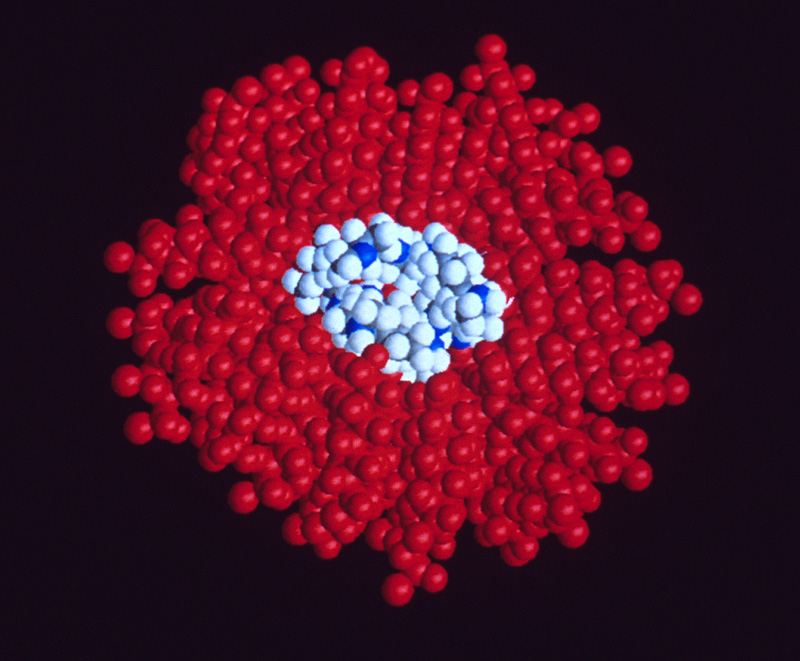
Computer-generated model of nanocrystal of perflubron (red) and gentamicin (white, an antibiotic)

Blood substitutes are the subject of research because the demand for blood transfusions grows faster than donations. In some scenarios, artificial blood may be more convenient or safe. Because fluorocarbons do not normally mix with water, they must be mixed into emulsions (small droplets of perfluorocarbon suspended in water) in order to be used as blood. One such product, Oxycyte, has been through initial clinical trials.

Possible medical uses of liquid breathing (which uses pure perfluorocarbon liquid, not a water emulsion) involve assistance for premature babies or for burn patients (if normal lung function is compromised). Both partial and complete filling of the lungs have been considered, although only the former has undergone any significant tests in humans. Several animal tests have been performed and there have been some human partial liquid ventilation trials. One effort, by Alliance Pharmaceuticals, reached clinical trials but was abandoned because of insufficient advantage compared to other therapies.

Nanocrystals represent a possible method of delivering water- or fat-soluble drugs within a perfluorochemical fluid. The use of these particles is being developed to help treat babies with damaged lungs.

Perfluorocarbons are banned from sports, where they may be used to increase oxygen use for endurance athletes. One cyclist, Mauro Gianetti, was investigated after a near-fatality where PFC use was suspected. Other posited applications include deep-sea diving and space travel, applications that both require total, not partial, liquid ventilation. The 1989 film The Abyss depicted a fictional use of perfluorocarbon for human diving but also filmed a real rat surviving while cooled and immersed in perfluorocarbon. (See also list of fictional treatments of perfluorocarbon breathing.)

== Agrichemicals ==
An estimated 30% of agrichemical compounds contain fluorine. Most of them are used as poisons, but a few stimulate growth instead.

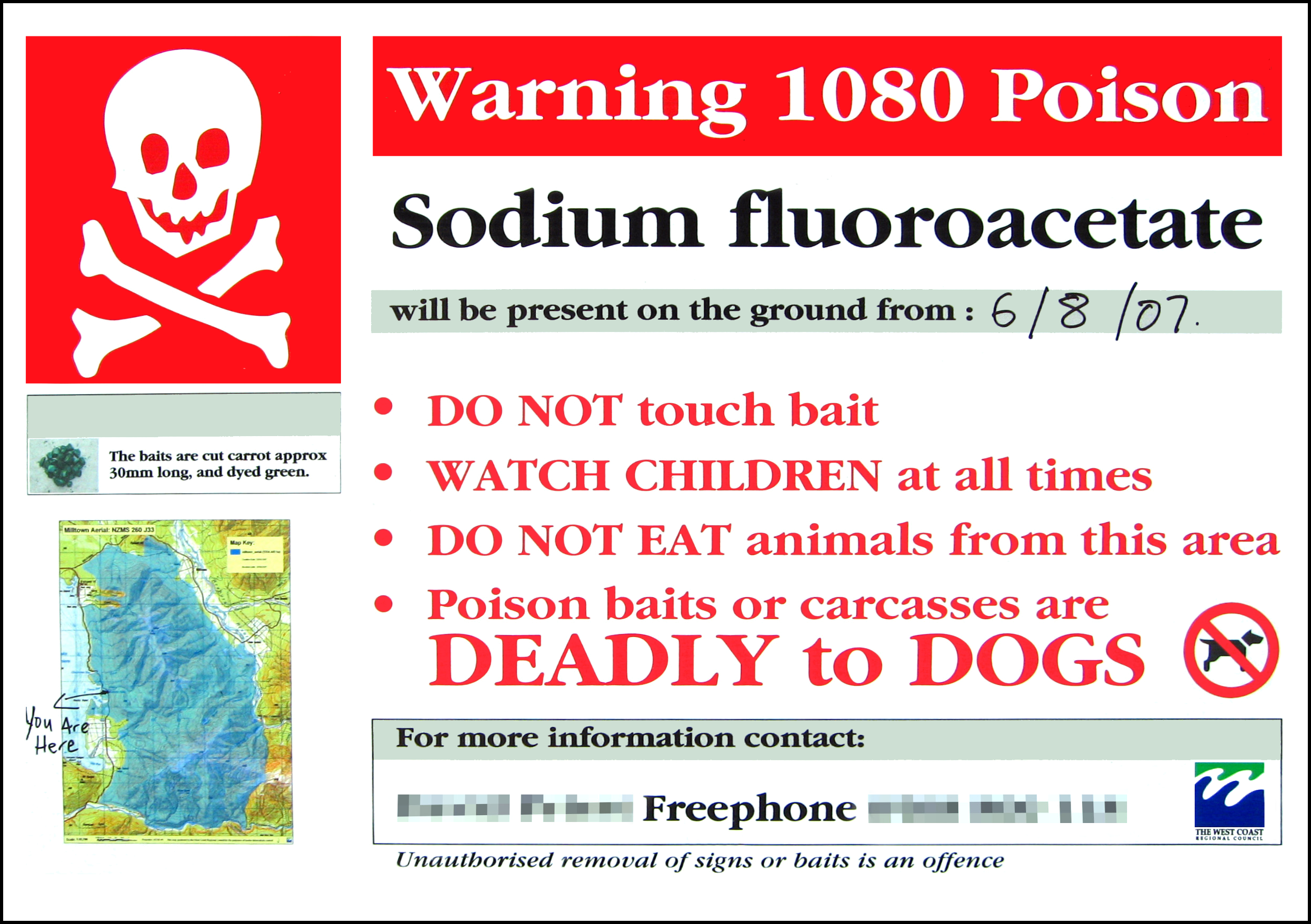
Sign warning of poisonous sodium fluoroacetate baits

Sodium fluoroacetate has been used as an insecticide, but it is especially effective against mammalian pests. The name "1080" refers to the catalogue number of the poison, which became its brand name. Fluoroacetate is similar to acetate, which has a pivotal role in the Krebs cycle (a key part of cell metabolism). Fluoroacetate halts the cycle and causes cells to be deprived of energy. Several other insecticides contain sodium fluoride, which is much less toxic than fluoroacetate. Insects fed 29-fluorostigmasterol use it to produce fluoroacetates. If a fluorine is transferred to a body cell, it blocks metabolism at the position occupied.

Trifluralin was widely used in the 20th century, for example, in over half of U.S. cotton field acreage in 1998. Because of its suspected carcinogenic properties some Northern European countries banned it in 1993. As of 2015, the European Union has banned it, although Dow made a case to cancel the decision in 2011.

== Biochemistry ==
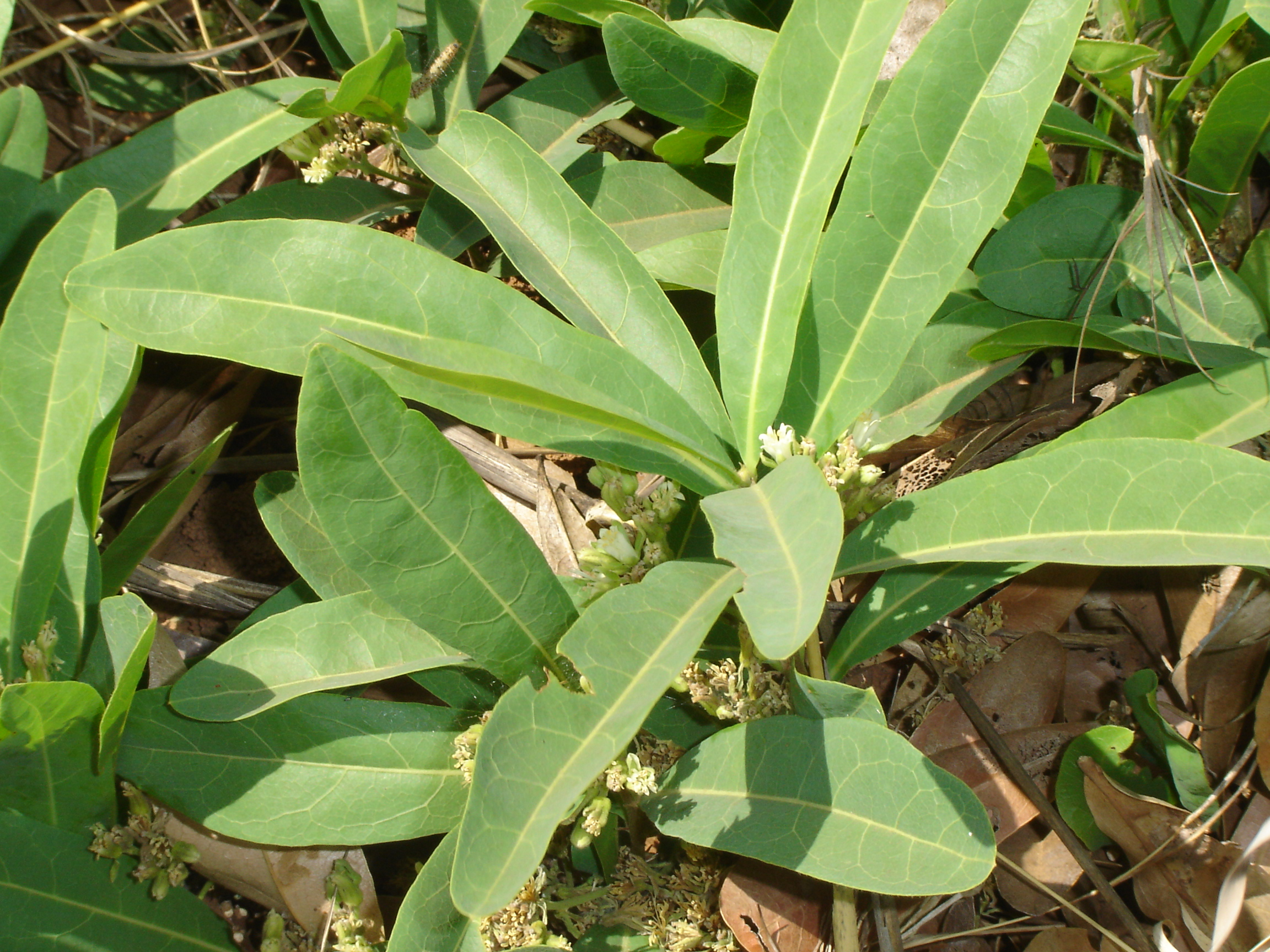
South Africa's gifblaar is one of the few organisms that naturally produce fluorine compounds

Biologically synthesized organofluorines are few in number, although some are widely produced. The most common example is fluoroacetate, with an active poison molecule identical to commercial "1080". It is used as a defense against herbivores by at least 40 green plants in Australia, Brazil, and Africa; other biologically synthesized organofluorines include ω-fluoro fatty acids, fluoroacetone, and 2-fluorocitrate. In bacteria, the enzyme adenosyl-fluoride synthase, which makes the carbon–fluorine bond, has been isolated. The discovery was touted as possibly leading to biological routes for organofluorine synthesis.

Fluoride is considered a semi-essential element for humans: not necessary to sustain life, but contributing (within narrow limits of daily intake) to dental health and bone strength. Daily requirements for fluorine in humans vary with age and sex, ranging from 0.01 mg in infants below 6 months to 4 mg in adult males, with an upper tolerable limit of 0.7 mg in infants to 10 mg in adult males and females. Small amounts of fluoride may be beneficial for bone strength, but this is an issue only in the formulation of artificial diets. (See also fluoride deficiency.)

== Hazards ==
NFPA 704 safety square
- 4 0 4 W The fire diamond hazard sign for elemental fluorine.

The U.S. hazard signs for commercially transported fluorine

=== Fluorine gas ===
Elemental fluorine is highly toxic. Above a concentration of 25 ppm, it causes significant irritation while attacking the eyes, airways and lungs and affecting the liver and kidneys. At a concentration of 100 ppm, human eyes and noses are seriously damaged. People can be exposed to fluorine in the workplace by breathing it in, skin contact, or eye contact. The Occupational Safety and Health Administration (OSHA) has set the legal limit (Permissible exposure limit) for fluorine exposure in the workplace as 0.1 ppm (0.2 mg/m^{3}) over an 8-hour workday. The National Institute for Occupational Safety and Health (NIOSH) has set a recommended exposure limit (REL) of 0.1 ppm (0.2 mg/m^{3}) over an 8-hour workday. At levels of 25 ppm, fluorine is immediately dangerous to life and health.

=== Hydrofluoric acid ===
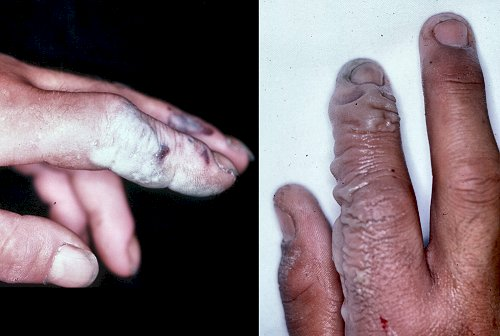
Typical HF burns: the outward signs may not be evident for 24 hours, after which calcium treatments are less effective.

Hydrofluoric acid, the water solution of hydrogen fluoride (HF), is a contact poison. Even though it is from a chemical perspective a relatively weak acid, it is far more dangerous than conventional strong mineral acids, such as nitric acid, sulfuric acid, or hydrochloric acid. Owing to its lesser chemical dissociation in water (remaining a neutral molecule), hydrogen fluoride penetrates tissue more quickly than typical acids. Poisoning can occur readily through the skin or eyes or when inhaled or swallowed. From 1984 to 1994, at least nine workers died in the United States from accidents with HF.

Once in the blood, hydrogen fluoride reacts with calcium and magnesium, resulting in electrolyte imbalances, potentially including hypocalcemia. The consequent effect on the heart (cardiac arrhythmia) may be fatal. Formation of insoluble calcium fluoride also causes severe pain. Burns with areas larger than 160 cm^{2}, about the size of a man's hand, can cause serious systemic toxicity.

Symptoms of exposure to hydrofluoric acid may not be immediately evident, with an eight-hour delay for 50% HF and up to 24 hours for lower concentrations. Hydrogen fluoride interferes with nerve function, meaning that burns may not initially be painful. If the burn has been initially noticed, then HF should be washed off with a forceful stream of water for ten to fifteen minutes to prevent its further penetration into the body. Clothing used by the person burned may also present a danger. Hydrofluoric acid exposure is often treated with calcium gluconate, a source of Ca^{2+} that binds with the fluoride ions. Skin burns can be treated with a water wash and 2.5 percent calcium gluconate gel or special rinsing solutions. Because HF is absorbed, further medical treatment is necessary. Calcium gluconate may be injected or administered intravenously. Use of calcium chloride is contraindicated and may lead to severe complications. Sometimes surgical excision of tissue or amputation is required.

=== Fluoride ion ===
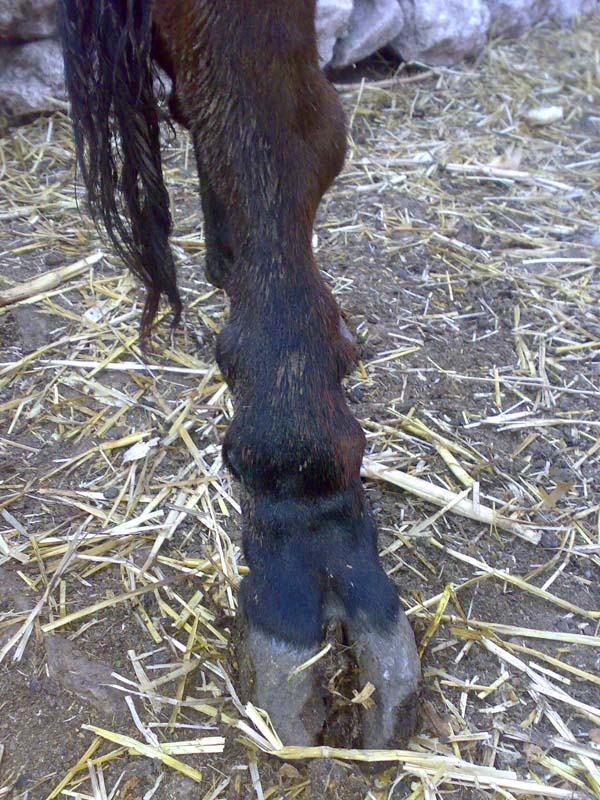
Moroccan cow with fluorosis, from industrial contamination

Soluble fluorides are moderately toxic. For sodium fluoride, the lethal dose for adults is 5–10 g, which is equivalent to 32–64 mg of elemental fluoride per kilogram of body weight. The dose that may lead to adverse health effects is about one fifth of the lethal dose. Chronic excess fluoride consumption can lead to skeletal fluorosis, a disease of the bones that affects millions in Asia and Africa.

The fluoride ion is readily absorbed by the stomach and intestines. Ingested fluoride forms hydrofluoric acid in the stomach. In this form, fluoride crosses cell membranes and then binds with calcium and interferes with various enzymes. Fluoride is excreted through urine. Fluoride exposure limits are based on urine testing, which is used to determine the human body's capacity for ridding itself of fluoride.

Historically, most cases of fluoride poisoning have been caused by accidental ingestion of insecticides containing inorganic fluoride. Most calls to poison control centers for possible fluoride poisoning come from the ingestion of fluoride-containing toothpaste. Malfunction of water fluoridation equipment has occurred several times, including an Alaskan incident that sickened nearly 300 people and killed one.

=== Biopersistence ===
Because of the strength of the carbon–fluorine bond, organofluorines endure in the environment. Perfluorinated compounds (PFCs) have attracted particular attention as persistent global contaminants. These compounds can enter the environment from their direct uses in waterproofing treatments and firefighting foams or indirectly from leaks from fluoropolymer production plants (where they are intermediates). Because of the acid group, PFCs are water-soluble in low concentrations. While there are other PFAAs, the lion's share of environmental research has been done on the two most well-known: perfluorooctanesulfonic acid (PFOS) and perfluorooctanoic acid (PFOA). The U.S. Environmental Protection Agency classifies these materials as "emerging contaminants" based on the growing but still incomplete understanding of their environmental impact.

Trace quantities of PFCs have been detected worldwide, in organisms from polar bears in the Arctic to the global human population. Both PFOS and PFOA have been detected in breast milk and the blood of newborns. A 2013 review showed widely varying amounts of PFOS and PFOA in different soils and groundwater, with no clear pattern of one chemical dominating. PFC concentrations were generally higher in areas with more human population or industrial activity, and areas with more PFOS generally also had more PFOA. the two chemicals have been found at different concentrations in different populations; for example, one study showed more PFOS than PFOA in Germans, while another study showed the reverse for Americans. PFCs may be starting to decrease in the biosphere: one study indicated that PFOS levels in wildlife in Minnesota were decreasing, presumably because 3M discontinued its production.

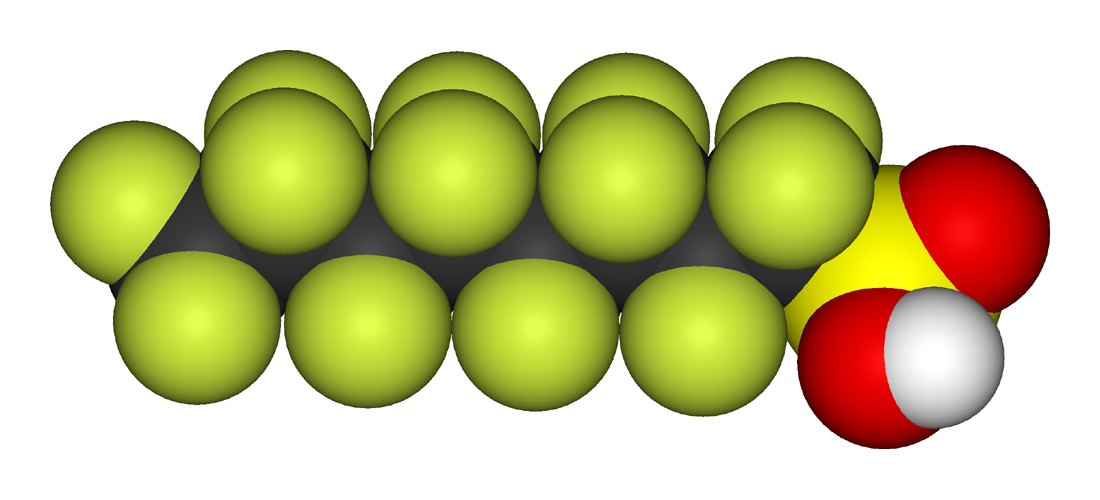
The PFOS molecule

In the body, PFCs bind to proteins such as serum albumin. Their tissue distribution in humans is unknown, but studies in rats suggest it is present mostly in the liver, kidney, and blood. They are not metabolized by the body but are excreted by the kidneys. Dwell time in the body varies greatly by species. Rodents have half-lives of days, while in humans they remain for years. Many animals show sex differences in the ability to rid the body of PFAAs, but without a clear pattern. Gender differences of half lives vary by animal species.

The potential health impact of PFCs is unclear. Unlike chlorinated hydrocarbons, PFCs are not lipophilic (stored in fat), nor genotoxic (damaging genes). Both PFOA and PFOS in high doses cause cancer and the death of newborns in rodents. Studies on humans have not been able to prove an impact at current exposures. Bottlenose dolphins have some of the highest PFOS concentrations of any wildlife studied; one study suggests an impact on their immune systems.

The biochemical causes of toxicity are also unclear and may differ by molecule, health effect, and even animal. PPAR-alpha is a protein that interacts with PFAAs and is commonly implicated in contaminant-caused rodent cancers.

Less fluorinated chemicals (i.e. not perfluorinated compounds) can also be detected in the environment. Because biological systems do not metabolize fluorinated molecules easily, fluorinated pharmaceuticals like antibiotics and antidepressants can be found in treated city sewage and wastewater. Fluorine-containing agrichemicals are measurable in farmland runoff and nearby rivers.

== See also ==
- Fluorine absorption dating (a relative method for archeological dating of bone or other organics)
- Fluorine deficiency
- Fluoride toxicity
