= Fluoride therapy =

Medical use of fluoride

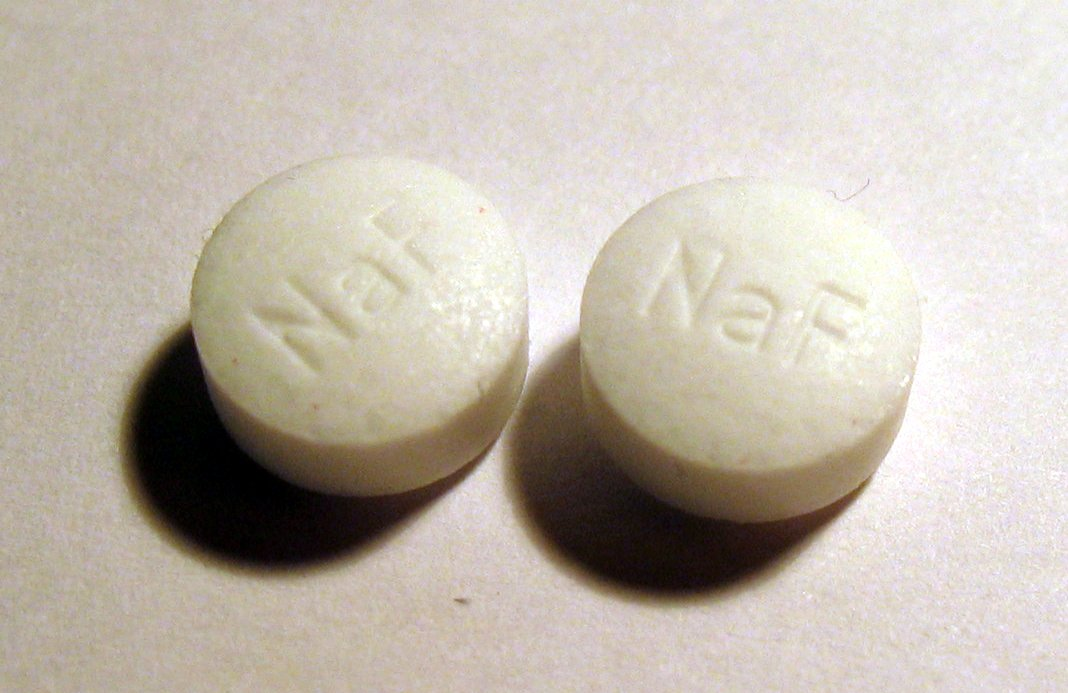
- Sodium fluoride tablets. Fluoride tablets are the least preferred fluoride therapy (topical therapies are more effective).

Clinical data
- Trade names: OrthoWash, PerioMed, others
- AHFS/Drugs.com: Monograph
- License data: US DailyMed: Fluoride
- Routes of administration: By mouth
- ATC code: A12CD (WHO)

Legal status
- Legal status: US: OTC

Identifiers
- CAS Number: 7681-49-4
- PubChem CID: 5235
- DrugBank: DB09325
- ChemSpider: 5045
- UNII: 8ZYQ1474W7
- KEGG: C08142
- ChEBI: CHEBI:28741

Chemical and physical data
- Formula: FNa
- Molar mass: 41.98817244 g·mol^{−1}
- 3D model (JSmol): Interactive image
- SMILES: [F-].[Na+]
- InChI: InChI=InChI=1S/FH.Na/h1H;/q;+1/p-1; Key:PUZPDOWCWNUUKD-UHFFFAOYSA-M

Fluoride therapy is the use of fluoride for medical purposes. Fluoride supplements are recommended to prevent tooth decay in children older than six months in areas where the drinking water is low in fluoride. It is typically used as a liquid, pill, or paste by mouth. Fluoride has also been used to treat a number of bone diseases.

Relatively high ingestion of fluoride by babies and children may result in white marks on the teeth known as fluorosis. Excessive ingestion by babies and children can result in severe dental fluorosis, indicated by a brown or yellow coloring, weakening and brittleness of the teeth, or in severe cases, acute toxicity. Fluoride therapy typically uses the sodium fluoride form, though stannous fluoride may also be used. Fluoride decreases breakdown of teeth by acids, promotes remineralisation, and decreases the activity of bacteria. Fluoride works primarily through direct contact with teeth.

Fluoride came into use to prevent tooth decay in the 1940s. Fluoride is on the World Health Organization's List of Essential Medicines. In 2021, it was the 291st most commonly prescribed medication in the United States, with more than 600,000 prescriptions.

== Medical uses ==
=== Dental caries ===
Fluoride therapy has a beneficial effect on the prevention of dental caries. Fluoride toothpaste, with concentrations of 1000 ppm and above, reduces the risk of dental caries in school-aged children and adolescents. As primary teeth are being developed, the ingestion of fluoride causes the teeth to form stronger and more resistant to cavities, although this increases the risk of dental fluorosis. Water and milk fluoridation are two forms of systemic fluoride therapy that are effective at preventing dental cavities.

=== Osteoporosis ===
Fluoride supplementation has been studied for the treatment of postmenopausal osteoporosis, for which it does not appear to be effective. Even though sodium fluoride increases bone density, it does not decrease the risk of fractures.

== Side effects ==
=== Fluorosis ===
The use of fluoride toothpaste (with concentrations of 1000 ppm and above) and fluoride supplements in children below the age of six years, especially within the first three years of life, is associated with a greater risk of dental fluorosis. The use of fluoride supplements during the last six months of pregnancy has no significant impact on the incidence of fluorosis in children. Optimal water fluoridation for the prevention of dental caries increases the prevalence of dental fluorosis by 4 to 5%. The observed effects are mild to moderate, usually of minimal aesthetic concern.

=== Other risks ===
Water fluoridation is not linked to the development of osteoporosis or cancer.

== Overdose ==
Consumption of large amounts of fluoride can lead to fluoride poisoning and death. The lethal dose for most adult humans is estimated at 5 to 10 grams, equivalent to 32 to 64 mg elemental fluoride per kg of body weight. Ingestion of fluoride can produce gastrointestinal discomfort at doses as low as 0.2 mg/kg, 20 times lower than lethal doses. Chronic intake and topical exposure may cause dental fluorosis, and excess systematic exposure can lead to skeletal fluorosis. The American Dental Association (ADA) recommends infants primarily consume human milk to reduce fluoride intake and prevent infants developing fluorosis.

In 1974, a three-year-old child swallowed 45 milliliters of 2% fluoride solution, triple the fatal amount, and died. The fluoride was administered during his first visit to the dentist, and the dental office was later found liable for the death.

== Mechanism ==
Effect of fluoridation on hydroxyapatite in tooth enamel

Strictly speaking, fluoride therapy repairs rather than prevents damage to the teeth, causing the mineral fluorapatite to be incorporated into damaged tooth enamel. Fluorapatite is not a natural component of human teeth, although it is found in the teeth of sharks. The main mineral found in natural tooth enamel is hydroxyapatite rather than the fluorapatite created in the presence of fluoride. Even without fluoride, teeth experience alternating increases and decreases in mineral content, depending upon how acidic or alkaline the mouth is, and depending upon the concentration of other substances in the mouth, such as phosphate and calcium.

Fluoride reduces the decay of tooth enamel by the formation of fluorapatite and its incorporation into the dental enamel. The fluoride ions reduce the rate of tooth enamel demineralization and increase the rate of remineralization of teeth at the early stages of cavities. Fluoride exerts these effects by the demineralization and remineralization cycle. The remineralization cycle, critical to decay prevention, occurs when fluoride is present in the oral cavity. After fluoride is swallowed it has a minimal effect.

Fluoride ions are involved in three principal reactions of remineralization:

1. Iso-ionic exchange of F^{−} for OH^{−} in apatite: Ca_{10}(PO_{4})_{6}(OH)_{2} + 2F^{−} → Ca_{10}(PO_{4})_{6}F_{2} + 2OH^{−}
2. Crystal growth of fluorapatite from a supersaturated solution: 10 Ca^{2+} + 6PO_{4}^{3−} + 2F^{−} → Ca_{10}(PO_{4})_{6}F_{2}
3. Apatite dissolution with CaF_{2} formation: Ca_{10}(PO_{4})_{6}(OH)_{2} + 2F^{−} → 10 CaF_{2} + 6PO_{4}^{3−} + 2OH^{−}

Iso-ionic exchange by the replacement of F^{−} for OH¯ in apatite and crystal growth of fluorapatite from supersaturated solutions are able to occur during exposure to low levels of fluoride (0.01–10 ppm F) over long periods of time. Reaction of apatite dissolution with CaF_{2} formation occurs in higher levels of fluoride (100–10,000 ppm F) and the addition of CaF_{2} or a CaF_{2} containing compound.

Fluoride's effect on oral microflora and the significance of this effect on fluoride's overall effectiveness against cavities does not currently have a consensus. Many studies on bacterial cells in laboratories have shown the fluoride has many effects on them as an antimicrobial agent. The antimicrobial effects require concentrations of fluoride at least 10 ppm F, which only occurs briefly in the mouth with oral fluoride-containing products. A study looked at fluoride's effects on oral microflora and concluded that fluoride may not solely interact as an antimicrobial agent, acting additionally to reduce bacterial adhesion to teeth, along with the primary action of decreasing demineralization. Further investigation will need to be done to verify these claims.

Fluoride can be delivered by many chemical methods (sodium fluoride, stannous fluoride, amine fluoride, monofluorophosphate, and more). The anti-caries performance differences between them have been shown to have less effect than variations in behavior shown by individuals in brushing, using fluoride products and post use behavior. Often the chemical form of fluoride is driven by compatibility with the other elements mixed with, price, and such.

All fluoridation methods provide low concentrations of fluoride ions in saliva, thus exerting a topical effect on the plaque fluid. Fluoride does not prevent cavities but rather controls the rate at which they develop, and so repeated exposure throughout the day is essential for its effective function. The more constant the supply the more beneficial fluoride will be in cavity prevention.

== Delivery ==
Fluoride conversion chart
APF (10)(%)(1000)	ppm
1.0%	10,000
1.23%	12,300
NaF (4.5)(%)(1000)	ppm
0.05%	225
0.20%	900
0.44%	1,980
1.0%	4,500
1.1%	4,950
2.0%	9,000
5.0%	22,500
SnF_{2} (2.4)(%)(1000)	ppm
0.40%	960
0.63%	1,512

=== Water fluoridation ===
Water fluoridation is the controlled addition of fluoride to a public water supply in order to reduce tooth decay. Its use in the U.S. began in the 1940s, following studies of children in a region where water is naturally fluoridated. In 1945, Grand Rapids, Michigan became the first city in the world to fluoridate its drinking water. The Grand Rapids water fluoridation study was originally sponsored by the U.S. Surgeon General, but was taken over by the NIDR shortly after the institute's inception in 1948. Fluoridation is now used for about two-thirds of the U.S. population on public water systems and for about 5.7% of people worldwide. Although the best available evidence shows no association with adverse effects other than fluorosis, most of which is mild, water fluoridation has been contentious and opposition to water fluoridation exists despite its support by public health organizations. Water fluoridation is the most cost-effective way to induce fluoride, with an estimated cost between US$0.50 and $3.00 per person per year, depending on the size of the community involved. A dollar spent on fluoridating water is estimated to save $7–42 on dental treatment.

=== Toothpaste ===
Most toothpastes contains between 0.22% (1,000 ppm) and 0.312% (1,450 ppm) fluoride, usually in the form of sodium fluoride, stannous fluoride, or sodium monofluorophosphate (MFP).

Frequent use of toothpaste with 1,100 ppm fluoride content enhances the remineralization of enamel and inhibits the demineralization of enamel and root surfaces.

Most toothpastes with fluoride contain mild abrasives in order to remove heavier debris and light surface staining. These abrasives include calcium carbonate, silica gels, magnesium carbonates and phosphate salts.

Fluoride is available in three forms during toothbrushing. First, it is available as a free ionic fluoride which can react with the tooth structure, interfere with the metabolism of bacteria in plaque, or absorb to the oral mucosa. Second, it is available as profluoride compounds which can precipitate in the mouth during toothbrushing and release ionic fluoride. Lastly, fluoride in toothpaste can exist as unavailable fluoride compounds which do not release fluoride ions. This is due to the fluoride ions being swallowed or expelled when spitting.

High-fluoride content toothpaste generally contains 1.1% (5,000 ppm) sodium fluoride toothpaste. This type of toothpaste is used in the same manner as regular toothpaste. The application of high-fluoride content toothpaste in adults twice daily improves the surface hardness of untreated root decay when compared to toothpaste with regular fluoride content.

Fluoridated toothpaste is also available in the form of 0.454% stannous fluoride (SnF_{2} with fluoride concentration 1,100 ppm). When combined with the stannous ion (Sn^{2+}), fluoride in toothpaste appears to have a wide range of benefits to oral health.

Toothpastes containing stannous fluoride have been shown to be more effective than other fluoride toothpastes for reducing dental decay, dental erosion, gingivitis, tooth hypersensitivity, dental plaque, calculus (tartar) and stains. A systematic review revealed stabilised stannous fluoride-containing toothpastes caused a reduction of plaque, gingivitis and staining in clinical trials, with a significant reduction in calculus and halitosis compared to other toothpastes.

Anti-sensitivity toothpastes with fluoride are also available for those who have sensitive teeth. Some anti-sensitivity toothpastes with fluoride on the market contain the ingredients called strontium chloride or potassium nitrate which help to alleviate tooth sensitivity.

=== Mouth rinses ===
Fluoride mouth rinses can be professionally applied by a dental professional or used at home. The most common fluoride compound used in mouth rinse is neutral sodium fluoride. Fluoride mouth rinses range from 0.05% to 0.2% (225–1,000 ppm) in concentration. The fluoride rinse with a 0.05% fluoride content is used for daily rinsing, while the rinse with 0.2% fluoride content is used for weekly rinsing and in school-based weekly rinsing programs. Fluoride at these concentrations is not strong enough for people at high risk for tooth decay. Regular use of a daily (230 ppm) or weekly (900 ppm) fluoride mouth rinse under supervision results into a reduction of tooth decay in children's permanent teeth. After a fluoride mouthrinse treatment, the fluoride in the mouthrinse is retained in the saliva which helps prevent tooth decay.

Fluoride mouth rinses are recommended for use in conjunction with other fluoride therapies, but is usually contraindicated for children under six years old as they may swallow the rinse and increase their risk of dental fluorosis. In areas without fluoridated drinking water, these rinses are recommended for children.

Many brands of topical fluoride exist. They are not recommended if a person is drinking water that already contains sufficient fluoride.

=== Gels/foams ===
There are several types of professionally applied fluoride gels and foams on the market. The types of professionally applied fluoride gels include 2.0% neutral sodium fluoride and 1.23% acidulated phosphate fluoride. Acidulated phosphate fluoride (APF) gel or foam comprises a sodium fluoride solution, paste, or powder that has been acidulated with hydrofluoric acid to pH 3 to 4, buffered with a phosphate, and mixed with a gel or foam vehicle such as carboxymethyl cellulose. 1.23% acidulated phosphate fluoride gel or foam is used for patients without tooth-colored restorations, while 2.0% neutral sodium fluoride is used for patients with composites, porcelain, titanium, sealants or sensitivity.

Professionally applied fluoride gel or foam is applied through the use of a foam mouth tray which is held in the mouth by gently biting down. The application usually lasts for approximately four minutes, and patients should not rinse, eat, smoke, or drink for 30 minutes after application. The reason for this is to allow the teeth to absorb the fluoride into the tooth structure when it is at its highest concentration, without being interrupted. This aids in the repair of microscopic dental decay. There is no clinical evidence on the effectiveness of one-minute fluoride gel/foam applications. A specific benefit when using foam is that less product is required during application, which results in a lower fluoride dose and lessens the risk of accidental ingestion. Additionally, more research regarding the efficacy of fluoride foam is needed as the evidence for its effectiveness is not as strong compared to those of fluoride gels and varnish.

Some gels are made for home application with the use of a custom tray. A model of a person's teeth can be made by a dental professional, who then uses that to make trays, similar to a sport guard tray, which is put over their teeth. The patient can then use this to hold a fluoride treatment against their teeth overnight or several minutes during the day. The concentration of fluoride in these gels is much lower than in professional products. The self-applied sodium fluoride gel/foam typically contains 0.5% fluoride and stannous fluoride gel/foam contains 0.15%.

Head and neck radiation treatment may destroy the cells of the salivary gland which can result in dry mouth. Patients with reduced salivary flow are at an increased risk of tooth decay. The home application of 1.1% fluoride gel with a custom tray is recommended for patients undergoing or are finished with head and neck radiation treatment and patients with decreased salivary flow.

More research is required regarding the efficacy of fluoride gels in treating initial dental decay lesions.

=== Varnish ===
Fluoride varnish has practical advantages over gels in ease of application and use of smaller volume of fluoride than required for gel applications. The principle of fluoride varnish is to apply fluoride salt in a very high concentration (approximately 50,000 ppm) onto the surface of the teeth. Fluoride varnish is a resin-based application that is designed to stay on the surface of the teeth for several hours. As this varnish rests on the tooth's surface, saliva dissolves the fluoride salt, which in turn allows fluoride ions to be released and absorbed by the teeth and soft tissues. Later, the fluoride is re-released into the oral cavity from these reservoirs which acts as protection for the teeth against cavities. Currently, there is also no published evidence that indicates that professionally applied fluoride varnish is a risk factor for enamel fluorosis. The varnish is applied with a brush and sets within seconds.

Fluoride varnish has shown to be effective in reducing initial dental decay lesions in both primary and permanent dentition. Application of fluoride varnish every six months is effective in preventing dental decay in primary and permanent teeth of children and adolescents.

=== Slow-release devices ===
Devices that slowly release fluoride can be implanted on the surface of a tooth, typically on the side of a molar where it is not visible and does not interfere with eating. The two main types are copolymer membrane and glass bead. These devices are effective in raising fluoride concentrations and in preventing cavities, but they have problems with retention rates, that is, the devices fall off too often. A 2018 Cochrane review found insufficient evidence to determine the effect of slow-release fluoride glass beads in caries-inhibiting when compared to other types of fluoride therapy.

=== Lozenges ===
Fluoridated lozenges may contain about 1 mg fluoride each, and are meant to be held in the mouth and sucked. The dissolved lozenge is swallowed slowly, so the use of lozenges is both a topical and a systemic therapy. A 1955 study comparing the effects of fluoride lozenges and fluoride pills provided clear evidence early that fluoride acts topically.

=== Medical supplements ===
Medical fluoride supplements in the form of tablets, lozenges, or liquids (including fluoride-vitamin preparations) are used primarily for children in areas without fluoridated drinking water. The evidence supporting the effectiveness of this treatment for primary teeth is weak. The supplements prevent cavities in permanent teeth. A significant side effect is mild to moderate dental fluorosis. A Cochrane review also found no evidence that daily fluoride supplementation in pregnant women was effective in preventing tooth decay or causing fluorosis in their children.

== See also ==
- Silver diammine fluoride
