= Kaj Roholm =

Danish scientist and researcher

Eli Kaj Roholm (October 7, 1902 – March 29, 1948) was a Danish scientist and researcher best known for his study of fluorine and fluoride toxicity.

== Biography ==
Eli Kaj Roholm was the son of Niels Christian Roholm, a Danish sea captain from Odense, and Hilda Vilhelmine Sabinsky, a Polish Jewish immigrant. He nonetheless continued in his capacity as Deputy Health Commissioner of Copenhagen during the Nazi occupation of Denmark.

Roholm and his wife Ida (née Høst) had three children.

== Scientific work ==
Roholm conducted laboratory studies, interviewed cryolite workers, visited factories, and documented the progression of fluorine poisoning in humans and animals from gastrointestinal upsets, neurological disorders, and bleeding gums to the advanced cases of skeletal fluorosis and crippling arthritis. Roholm published Fluorine Intoxication: A Clinical and Hygeienic Study in 1937, hailed by American dental researcher H. Trendley Dean in 1938 for its thoroughness and as the "most outstanding contribution to the literature of fluorine."

Roholm advocated for better worker protection and workers' compensation for chronic and acute fluoride poisoning, as well as for protection of neighboring countryside from the effects of fluoride pollution. He opposed adding fluoride to medicines, food or water.

== See also ==
- Water fluoridation
- 1930 Meuse Valley fog
