= Fluorine deficiency =

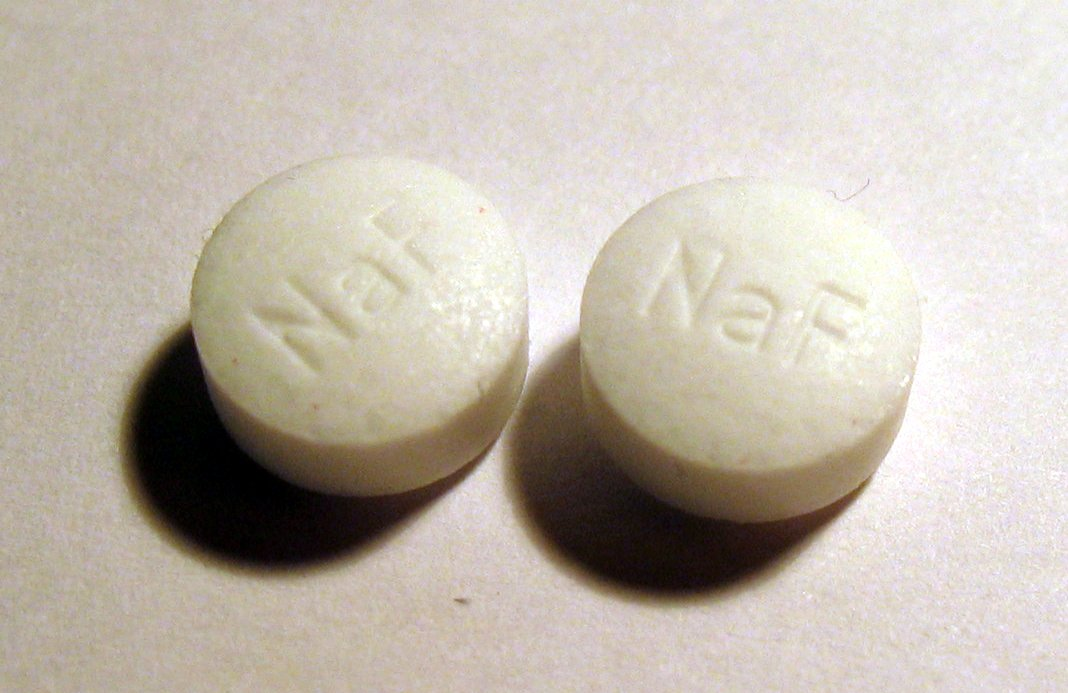
- Fluoride is sold in tablets for cavity prevention.
- Causes: Lack of fluoride in the diet, poor oral hygiene
- Risk factors: Dental caries

Fluoride or fluorine deficiency is a disorder which may cause increased dental caries and possibly osteoporosis, due to a lack of fluoride in diet. Common dietary sources of fluoride include tea, grape juice, wine, raisins, some seafood, coffee, and tap water that has been fluoridated. The extent to which the condition truly exists, and its relationship to fluoride poisoning has given rise to some controversy. Fluorine is not considered to be an essential nutrient, but the importance of fluorides for preventing tooth decay is well-recognized, despite the effect is predominantly topical. Prior to 1981, the effect of fluorides was thought to be largely systemic and preeruptive, requiring ingestion. Fluoride is considered essential in the development and maintenance of teeth by the American Dental Hygienists' Association. Fluoride incorporates into the teeth to form and harden teeth enamels. This makes the teeth more acid resistant, as well as more resistant to cavity-forming bacteria. Caries-inhibiting effects of fluoride were first noticed 1902, when fluoride in high concentrations was found to stain teeth and prevent tooth decay.

Fluoride salts, particularly sodium fluoride (NaF), are used in the treatment and prevention of osteoporosis. Symptoms such as fractured hips in the elderly or brittle and weak bones may be caused by fluorine deficiency in the body. Fluoride stimulates bone formation and increases bone density; however, bone with excess fluoride content has an abnormal structure resulting in increased fragility. Thus, fluoride therapy results in large increases in bone mineral density but the effect on fracture rates, while positive, is small.

Disputes over the essential nature of fluorine date back to the 19th century, when fluorine was first observed in teeth and bones. In 1973, a trial claimed to have found reduced reproduction in mice fed on fluorine-deficient diets; however, a subsequent investigation found that this was likely due to an iron-deficient diet.

== Role of fluoride ==
Fluoride increases resistance to the "demineralization of tooth enamel during attack by acidic bacteria". While essential for all individuals, fluoride's effects are most significant in children, as the fluoride is incorporated into their developing enamel. This in turn causes their teeth to become less prone to decay. Therefore, a relationship can be formulated, in that the more fluoride entering the body, the overall decline in the rate of decay.

== Sources of fluoride ==
Fluorine is the 13th most abundant element in the Earth's crust. The ionic form of fluorine is called fluoride. Fluoride is most commonly found as inorganic or organic fluorides such as naturally occurring calcium fluoride, or synthetic sodium fluoride. There are a number of sources of fluoride.

=== Water ===
Fluoride occurs naturally within water supplies. As an example, in Australia, at a concentration of approximately 0.1 mg/L. However, this number varies amongst different populations, as specific fluoridated communities exceed this amount, ranging from 0.6 to 1.0 mg/L of fluoride present. The process of incorporating more fluoride into water systems is an affordable mechanism that has many long-term benefits

=== Toothpaste ===
Fluoride toothpaste started being produced in the 1890s, and has since become available in most countries.

=== Fluoride supplements ===
Fluoride supplements were first recognized and suggested by health professionals, in areas where the practice of fluoridating water was not accepted. This practice is recommended for individuals, primarily children (who are at a greater risk of caries) in low-fluoride areas.

== Dietary recommendations ==
The U.S. Institute of Medicine (IOM) updated Estimated Average Requirements (EARs) and Recommended Dietary Allowances (RDAs) for some minerals in 1997. Where there was not sufficient information to establish EARs and RDAs, an estimate designated Adequate Intake (AI) was used instead. AIs are typically matched to actual average consumption, with the assumption that there appears to be a need, and that need is met by what people consume. The current AI for women 19 years and older is 3.0 mg/day (includes pregnancy and lactation). The AI for men is 4.0 mg/day. The AI for children ages 1–18 increases from 0.7 to 3.0 mg/day. As for safety, the IOM sets Tolerable upper intake levels (ULs) for vitamins and minerals when evidence is sufficient. In the case of fluoride, the UL is 10 mg/day. Collectively the EARs, RDAs, AIs and ULs are referred to as Dietary Reference Intakes (DRIs).

The European Food Safety Authority (EFSA) refers to the collective set of information as Dietary Reference Values, with Population Reference Intake (PRI) instead of RDA, and Average Requirement instead of EAR. AI and UL are defined the same as in the United States. For women ages 18 and older, the AI is set at 2.9 mg/day (includes pregnancy and lactation). For men, the value is 3.4 mg/day. For children ages 1–17 years, the AIs increase with age from 0.6 to 3.2 mg/day. These AIs are comparable to the U.S. AIs. The EFSA reviewed safety evidence and set an adult UL at 7.0 mg/day (lower for children).

== See also ==
- Water fluoridation
- Public relations campaigns of Edward Bernays
