= Fluorine cycle =

Biogeochemical cycle

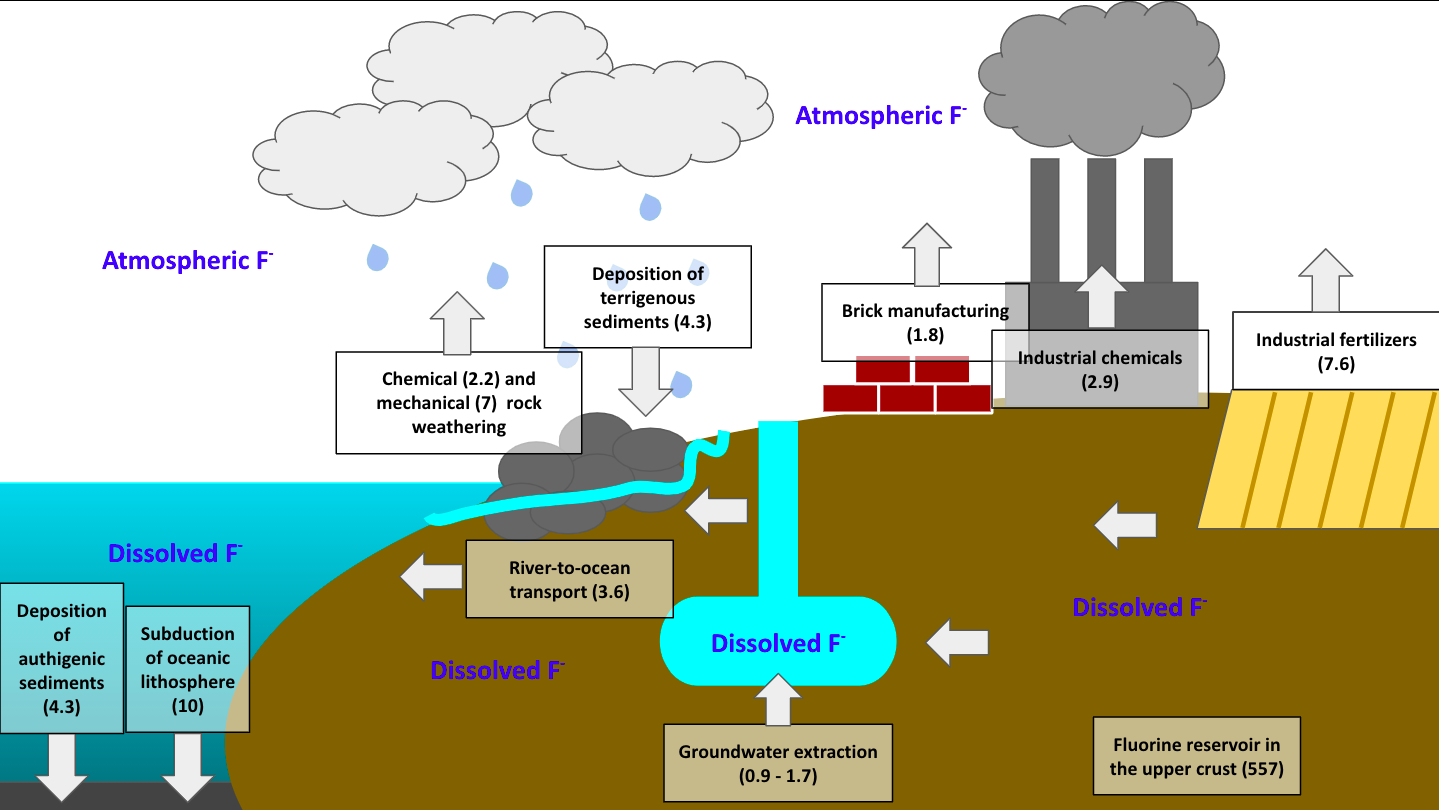
Fluorine cycle: F fluxes are in Tg/yr and reservoir data is in mg/kg. The major mechanisms that mobilize fluorine are chemical and mechanical weathering of rocks. Major anthropogenic sources also include industrial chemicals and fertilizers, brick manufacturing, and groundwater extraction. Fluorine is primarily carried by rivers to the oceans, where it can have a residence time of about 500,000 years. Fluorine can be removed from the ocean by deposition of terrigenous or authigenic sediments, or subduction of the oceanic lithosphere.

The fluorine cycle is the series of biogeochemical processes through which fluorine moves through the lithosphere, hydrosphere, atmosphere, and biosphere. Fluorine originates from the Earth's crust, and its cycling between various sources and sinks is modulated by a variety of natural and anthropogenic processes.

== Overview ==
Fluorine is the thirteenth most abundant element on Earth and the 24th most abundant element in the universe. It is the most electronegative element and it is highly reactive. Thus, it is rarely found in its elemental state, although elemental fluorine has been identified in certain geochemical contexts. Instead, it is most frequently found in ionic compounds (e.g. HF, CaF_{2}).

The major mechanisms that mobilize fluorine are chemical and mechanical weathering of rocks. Major anthropogenic sources include industrial chemicals and fertilizers, brick manufacturing, and groundwater extraction. Fluorine is primarily carried by rivers to the oceans, where it has a residence time of about 500,000 years. Fluorine can be removed from the ocean by deposition of terrigenous or authigenic sediments, or subduction of the oceanic lithosphere.

== Lithosphere ==
The vast majority of the Earth's fluorine is found in the crust, where it is primarily found in hydroxysilicate minerals. Levels of fluorine in igneous rocks vary greatly, and are influenced by the fluorine contents of magma. Likewise, altered oceanic crust exhibits large variability in fluorine; serpentinization zones contain elevated levels of fluorine. Many details concerning the exact mineralogy and distribution of fluorine in the crust are poorly understood, particularly fluorine's abundance in metamorphic rocks, in the mantle, and in the core.

Fluorine can be liberated from its crustal reservoirs via natural processes (such as weathering, erosion, and volcanic activity) or anthropogenic processes, such as phosphate rock processing, coal combustion, and brick-making. Anthropogenic contributions to the fluorine cycle are significant, with anthropogenic emissions contributing about 55% of global fluorine inputs.

== Hydrosphere ==
Fluorine can dissolve into waters as the anion fluoride, where is abundance depends on local abundance within the surrounding rocks. This is in contrast to other halogen abundances, which tend to reflect the abundance of other local halogens, rather than the local rock composition. Dissolved fluoride is present found in low abundances in surface runoff in rainwater and rivers, and higher concentrations (74 micromolar) in seawater. Fluorine can also enter surface waters via volcanic plumes.

== Atmosphere ==
Fluorine can enter the atmosphere via volcanic activity and other geothermal emissions, as well as via biomass burning and wind-blown dust plumes. Additionally, it can come from a wide variety of anthropogenic sources, including coal combustion, brick-making, uranium processing, chemical manufacturing, aluminum production, glass etching, and the microelectronics/semiconductor industry. Fluorine can also enter the atmosphere as a product of reactions between anthropogenically-generated atmospheric chemicals (for example, uranium fluoride). Furthermore, fluorine is a component in chlorofluorocarbon gases (CFCs), which were mass-produced throughout the 20th century until the detrimental effects associated with their breakdown into highly reactive chlorine and chlorine oxide species were better understood. The majority of contemporary studies on atmospheric fluorine focus on hydrogen fluoride (HF) in the troposphere, due to HF gas's toxicity and high reactivity.

Fluorine can be removed from the atmosphere via "wet" deposition, by precipitating out of rain, dew, fog, or cloud droplets, or via "dry" deposition, which refers to any processes that do not involve liquid water, such as adherence to surface materials as driven by atmospheric turbulence. HF can also be removed from the atmosphere via photochemical reactions in the stratosphere.

== Biosphere ==
Fluorine is an important element for biological systems. From a mammalian health perspective, it is notable as a component of fluorapatite, a key mineral in the teeth of humans that have been exposed to fluorine, as well as shark and fish teeth. In soil, fluorine can act as a source for biological systems and a sink for atmospheric processes, as atmospheric fluorine can leach to considerable depths.
