= H. Trendley Dean =

American dentist (1893–1962)

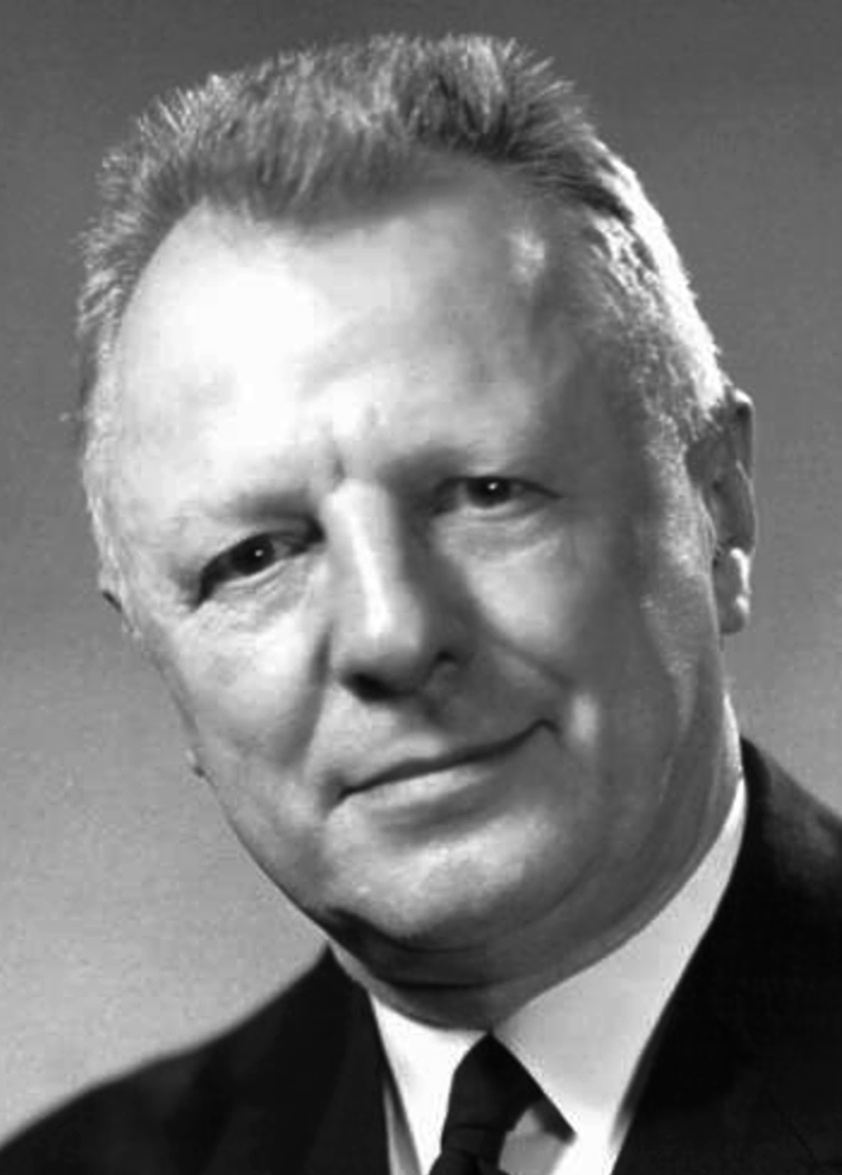
- Born: Henry Trendley Dean; August 25, 1893; Winstanley Park (now East St. Louis), Illinois, U.S.
- Died: May 13, 1962 (aged 68)
- Education: St. Louis University
- Occupation: Dentist
- Known for: Work on water fluoridation
- Title: Director of National Institute of Dental Research
- Term: 1948–1953
- Successor: Francis A. Arnold Jr.

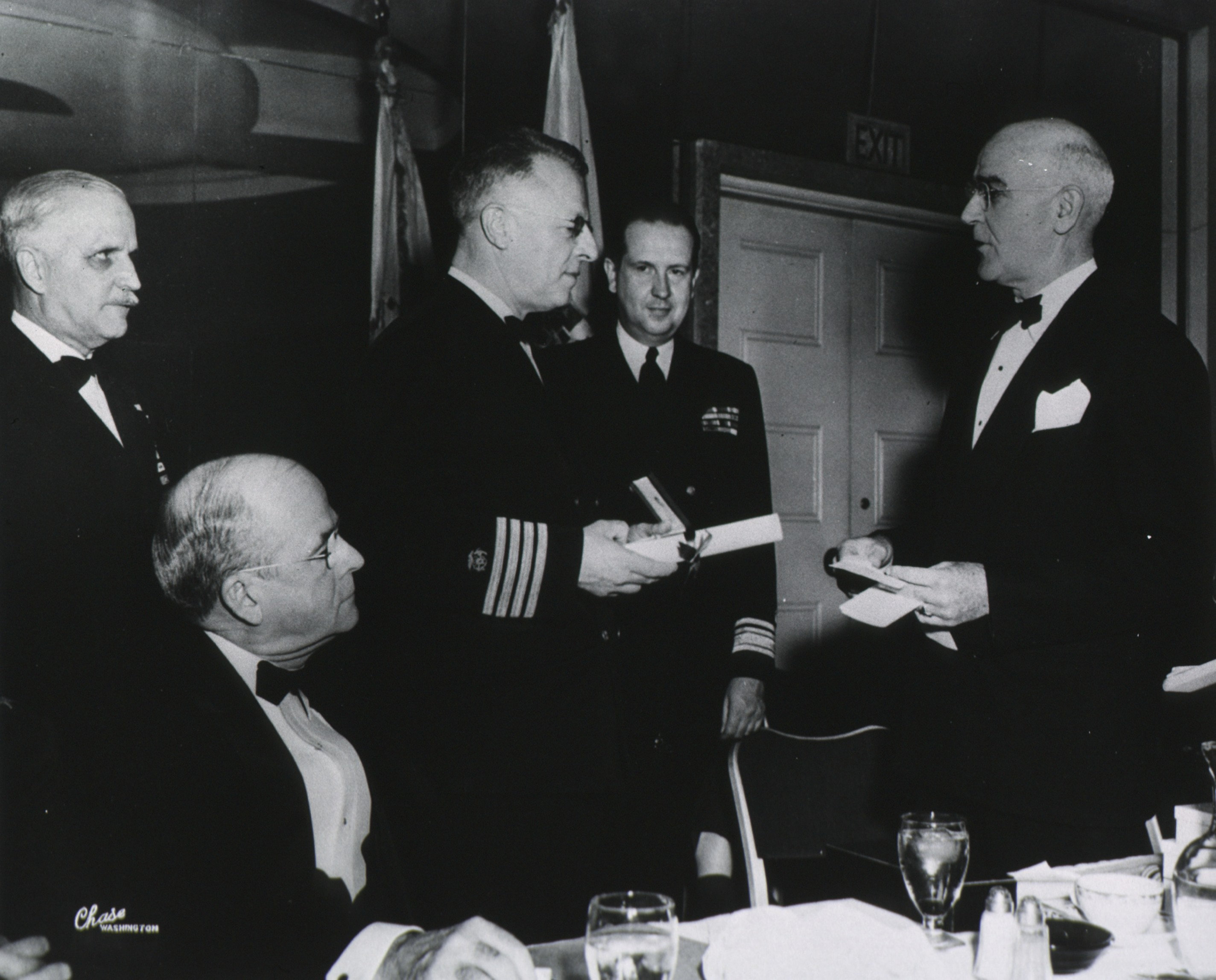
Dean receives the Gorgas Award for 1949

Henry Trendley Dean (August 25, 1893 – May 13, 1962) was the first director of the United States National Institute of Dental Research and a pioneer investigator of water fluoridation in the prevention of tooth decay.

== Early life ==
Dean was born in Winstanley Park, Illinois (now part of East St. Louis) on August 25, 1893, the son of William Ware and Rosalie Harriet Dean; his mother's maiden name was Trendley. He received his dental degree from St. Louis University in 1916 and entered private practice that year in Wood River, Illinois. During World War I, he served with the United States Army until 1919, when he returned to his practice. Dean married Ruth Martha McEvoy on September 14, 1921. Also in 1921, he entered the United States Public Health Service and was stationed in several U.S. Marine Hospitals until 1931 when he was placed in charge of dental research at the National Institute of Health, advancing to director of the dental research section in 1945. After World War II, he directed epidemiologic studies for the Army in Germany. When Congress established the National Institute of Dental Research in 1948, Dean was appointed its director, a position he held until retiring in 1953.

== Research into water fluoridation ==
Dean's legacy comes almost entirely from his research into fluoridation. At the urging of Frederick McKay and others concerned with the brown-staining of teeth in certain regions of the country, Dean was asked to make this his first assignment at the Institute in 1931.

Dean was part of a team that focused on determining optimal concentrations of fluoride in drinking water that would only cause minimal and mild mottled enamel on the teeth (dental fluorosis), while at the same time precipitating lower rates of dental caries (cavities). In 1934, as part of this work, Dean published an index to categorize the severity of dental fluorosis. In 1939 he reported on children who grew up in 4 nearby Illinois towns: Overall caries in the low fluoride towns were 2-3 times the caries in high fluoride towns. The greatest difference was in cavities between the front teeth, where the low fluoride kids had 16X the caries.

The August 1, 1943, Journal of The American Dental Association referenced Dean as acknowledging the difficulty of identifying an optimal concentration with the following quote, "The same amount of fluorine that causes a mild toxic reaction in one individual may cause a severe reaction in another. In other words we are dealing with a low-grade chronic poisoning of the formative dental organ in which case some individuals may show a more severe reaction than others having a comparable fluorine intake." Dean's professional life was spent searching for an optimal level of fluoride that would prevent tooth decay yet avoid staining or otherwise damaging teeth. In 1952, McKay and Dean were presented with the Albert Lasker Award for Clinical Medical Research by the American Public Health Association for their work with fluoride.

== Later life ==
After his retirement, Dean joined the American Dental Association as Secretary of its Council on Dental Research. In this role, he continued to advocate and defend the addition of fluoride to public drinking water. He was frequently called to speak on the subject in the United States and abroad, mostly to refute the arguments of those who opposed water fluoridation. In 1949, he was presented with the Gorgas Medal from the Association of Military Surgeons of the United States (AMSUS). He died in 1962, after a long battle with asthma and emphysema.

The International Association for Dental Research has an award named after Dean, called the H. Trendley Dean Memorial Award, recognizing meritorious research in epidemiology and public health.
