= Enamel microabrasion =

Cosmetic dentistry procedure

Enamel microabrasion is a procedure in cosmetic dentistry used to improve the appearance of the teeth. Like tooth whitening it is used to remove discolorations of the tooth surface but microabrasion is both a mechanical and chemical procedure.

== History ==
In the past, teeth with stains or other color changes were made to look better through the use of restorative materials, such as dental porcelain. These materials would create a thin veneer over the outer surface of the tooth. Although veneers looked better, these materials did not match the structure or characteristics of the tooth enamel and replacement was frequently needed. As far back as 1916, some researchers were advocating instead removing a thin layer of the outermost enamel to expose the (presumably) undamaged layer underneath. The first practical application of enamel microabrasion was developed by Theodore Croll and Richard Cavanaugh in 1986, who used a combination of weak hydrochloric acid and pumice to remove a few tenths of millimeters of the enamel.

== Description ==
Contemporary enamel microabrasion uses a combination of mechanical and chemical means to remove of a small amount of tooth enamel (not more than a few tenths of a millimeter) to eliminate superficial discoloration. These discolorations can result from either from extrinsic factors (such as tobacco, dental plaque, certain foods, etc.) or intrinsic ones (most commonly dental fluorosis).

== Indications ==
Dental fluorosis is the most common indication where it ranges in severity from mild to severe, microabrasion should be considered the first option in treating mild and moderate cases of fluorosis.

Removal of intrinsic enamel stains, correction of surface irregularities and defects in enamel caused either after removal of orthodontic appliances or during tooth formation.

== Contraindications ==
The patients' age is not a limiting factor for the enamel microabrasion technique but in cases of not fully erupted teeth, it may be difficult to place rubber dam for the microabrasion process

Microabrasion is not indicated when discoloration is located in dentin such as in dentigenous imperfecta or tetracycline discoloration.

Should be delayed or not used in patients with deficient labial seal because enamel surfaces are extremely dry which makes stains more obvious.so, Sundfeld, et al in 2007, found that orthodontic lip repositioning should be done first to make removal of these stains more effective.

== Consequences ==
Patients can benefit from combined microabrasion and bleaching techniques as microabrasion causes reduction in the enamel surface and sometimes the tooth surface appear yellowish or darker due to exposure of dentin surface and thinning of enamel layer over it. In this condition, correction of this yellow color can be achieved by using tooth whitening technique to mask the color.

Fragoso, et al. (2011) found that applying fluoride paste on enamel surface after microabrasion process provides higher hardness & more enamel smoothness. in addition, Segura et al found that the treated enamel surface become more resistant to demineralisation than untreated enamel and less colonisation of bacteria occur.
