= Fluoride =

Ion of fluorine

Names
- IUPAC name Fluoride

Identifiers
CAS Number	16984-48-8
3D model (JSmol)	Interactive image
ChEBI	CHEBI:17051
ChEMBL	ChEMBL1362
ChemSpider	26214
Gmelin Reference	14905
KEGG	C00742
MeSH	Fluoride
PubChem CID	28179
UNII	Q80VPU408O
- InChI: InChI=1S/FH/h1H/p-1 Key: KRHYYFGTRYWZRS-UHFFFAOYSA-M
- SMILES: [F-]

Properties
Chemical formula	F^{−}
Molar mass	18.998403163 g·mol^{−1}
Conjugate acid	Hydrogen fluoride

Thermochemistry
Std molar entropy (S^{⦵}_{298})	145.58 J/(mol⋅K) (gaseous)
Std enthalpy of formation (Δ_{f}H^{⦵}_{298})	−333 kJ/mol

Related compounds
Other anions	Chloride; Bromide; Iodide
- Except where otherwise noted, data are given for materials in their standard state (at 25 °C [77 °F], 100 kPa). Infobox references

Fluoride (/ˈflʊəraɪd, ˈflɔːr-/) is an inorganic, monatomic anion of fluorine, with the chemical formula F^{−} (also written [F]^{−}), whose salts are typically white or colorless. Fluoride salts typically have distinctive bitter tastes and are odorless. Its salts and minerals are important chemical reagents and industrial chemicals, mainly used in the production of hydrogen fluoride for fluorocarbons. Fluoride is classified as a weak base, since it only partially associates in solution, but concentrated fluoride is corrosive and can attack the skin.

Fluoride is the simplest fluorine anion. In terms of charge and size, the fluoride ion resembles the hydroxide ion. Fluoride ions occur on Earth in several minerals, particularly fluorite, but are present only in trace quantities in bodies of water in nature.

== Nomenclature ==
Fluorides include compounds that contain ionic fluoride and those in which fluoride does not dissociate. The nomenclature does not distinguish these situations. For example, sulfur hexafluoride and carbon tetrafluoride are not sources of fluoride ions under ordinary conditions.

The systematic name fluoride, the valid IUPAC name, is determined according to the additive nomenclature. However, the name fluoride is also used in compositional IUPAC nomenclature which does not take the nature of bonding involved into account. Fluoride is also used non-systematically, to describe compounds which release fluoride upon dissolving. Hydrogen fluoride is itself an example of a non-systematic name of this nature. However, it is also a trivial name, and the preferred IUPAC name for fluorane.

== Occurrence ==
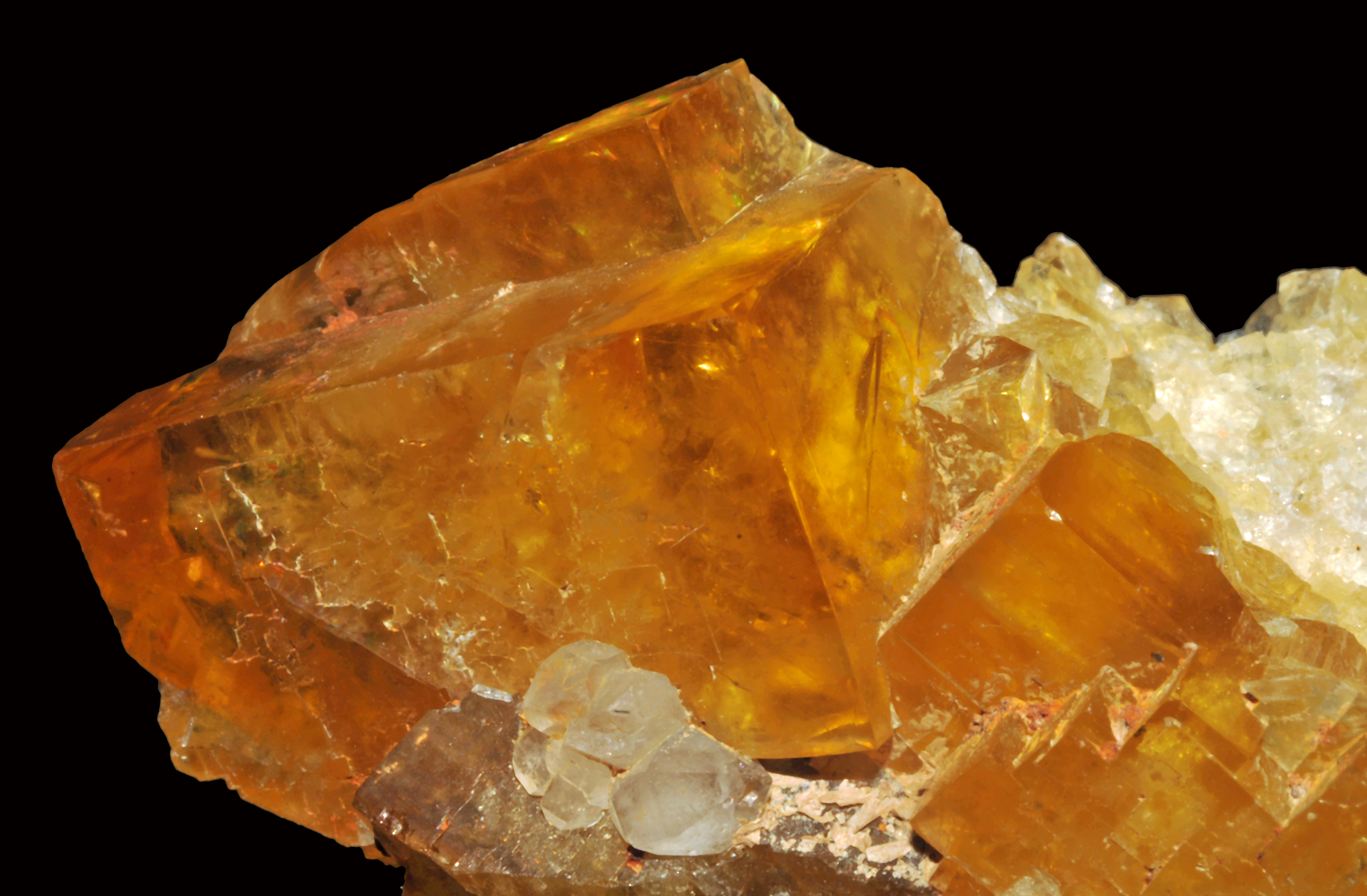
Fluorite crystals

Fluorine is estimated to be the 13th-most abundant element in Earth's crust and is widely dispersed in nature, entirely in the form of fluorides. The vast majority is held in mineral deposits, the most commercially important of which is fluorite (CaF_{2}). Natural weathering of some kinds of rocks, as well as human activities, releases fluorides into the biosphere through what is sometimes called the fluorine cycle.

=== In water ===
Fluoride is naturally present in groundwater, fresh and saltwater sources, as well as in rainwater, particularly in urban areas exposed to air pollution. Seawater fluoride levels are usually in the range of 0.86 to 1.4 mg/L, and average 1.1 mg/L (milligrams per litre). For comparison, chloride concentration in seawater is about 19 g/L. The low concentration of fluoride reflects the insolubility of the alkaline earth fluorides, e.g., CaF_{2}.

Concentrations in fresh water vary more significantly. Surface water such as rivers or lakes generally contains between 0.01 and 0.3 mg/L. Groundwater (well water) concentrations vary even more, depending on the presence of local fluoride-containing minerals. For example, natural levels of under 0.05 mg/L have been detected in parts of Canada but up to 8 mg/L in parts of China; in general levels rarely exceed 10 mg/L.

- In parts of Asia the groundwater can contain dangerously high levels of fluoride, leading to serious health problems.
- Worldwide, 50 million people receive water from water supplies that naturally have close to the "optimal level".
- In other locations the level of fluoride is very low, sometimes leading to fluoridation of public water supplies to bring the level to around 0.7–1.2 ppm.
- Mining can increase local fluoride levels.

Fluoride can be present in rain, with its concentration increasing significantly upon exposure to volcanic activity or atmospheric pollution derived from burning fossil fuels or other sorts of industry, particularly aluminium smelters.

=== In plants ===
All vegetation contains some fluoride, which is absorbed from soil and water. Some plants concentrate fluoride from their environment more than others. All tea leaves contain fluoride; however, mature leaves contain as much as 10 to 20 times the fluoride levels of young leaves from the same plant.

== Chemical properties ==
=== Basicity ===
Fluoride can act as a Lewis base. It can combine with a proton ( H^{+}):

F^{−} + H^{+} → HF

This neutralization reaction forms hydrogen fluoride (HF), the conjugate acid of fluoride.

In aqueous solution, fluoride has a pK_{b} value of 10.8. It is therefore a weak base, and tends to remain as the fluoride ion rather than generating a substantial amount of hydrogen fluoride. That is, the following equilibrium favours the left-hand side in water:

F^{−} + H_{2}O ⇌ HF + HO^{−}

However, upon prolonged contact with moisture, soluble fluoride salts will decompose to their respective hydroxides or oxides, as the hydrogen fluoride escapes. Fluoride is distinct in this regard among the halides. The identity of the solvent can have a dramatic effect on the equilibrium shifting it to the right-hand side, greatly increasing the rate of decomposition.

=== Structure of fluoride salts ===
Salts containing fluoride are numerous and adopt myriad structures. Typically the fluoride anion is surrounded by four or six cations, as is typical for other halides. Sodium fluoride and sodium chloride adopt the same structure. For compounds containing more than one fluoride per cation, the structures often deviate from those of the chlorides, as illustrated by the main fluoride mineral fluorite (CaF_{2}) where the Ca^{2+} ions are surrounded by eight F^{−} centers. In CaCl_{2}, each Ca^{2+} ion is surrounded by six Cl^{−} centers. The difluorides of the transition metals often adopt the rutile structure whereas the dichlorides have cadmium chloride structures.

=== Inorganic chemistry ===
Upon treatment with a standard acid, fluoride salts convert to hydrogen fluoride and metal salts. With very strong acids, it can be doubly protonated to give H_{2}F^{+}. Oxidation of fluoride gives fluorine. Solutions of inorganic fluorides in water contain F^{−} and bifluoride HF^{−}_{2}. Few inorganic fluorides are soluble in water without undergoing significant hydrolysis. In terms of its reactivity, fluoride differs significantly from chloride and other halides, and is more strongly solvated in protic solvents due to its smaller radius/charge ratio. Its closest chemical relative is hydroxide, since both have similar geometries.

=== Naked fluoride ===
Most fluoride salts dissolve to give the bifluoride (HF^{−}_{2}) anion. Sources of true F^{−} anions are rare because the highly basic fluoride anion abstracts protons from many, even adventitious, sources. Relative unsolvated fluoride, which does exist in aprotic solvents, is called "naked". Naked fluoride is a strong Lewis base, and a powerful nucleophile. Some quaternary ammonium salts of naked fluoride include tetramethylammonium fluoride and tetrabutylammonium fluoride. Cobaltocenium fluoride is another example. However, they all lack structural characterization in aprotic solvents. Because of their high basicity, many so-called naked fluoride sources are in fact bifluoride salts. In late 2016 imidazolium fluoride was synthesized that is the closest approximation of a thermodynamically stable and structurally characterized example of a "naked" fluoride source in an aprotic solvent (acetonitrile). The sterically demanding imidazolium cation stabilizes the discrete anions and protects them from polymerization.

=== Biochemistry ===
At physiological pHs, hydrogen fluoride is usually fully ionised to fluoride. In biochemistry, fluoride and hydrogen fluoride are equivalent. Fluorine, in the form of fluoride, is considered to be a micronutrient for human health, necessary to prevent dental cavities, and to promote healthy bone growth. The tea plant (Camellia sinensis L.) is a known accumulator of fluorine compounds, released upon forming infusions such as the common beverage. The fluorine compounds decompose into products including fluoride ions. Fluoride is the most bioavailable form of fluorine, and as such, tea is potentially a vehicle for fluoride dosing. Approximately, 50% of absorbed fluoride is excreted renally with a twenty-four-hour period. The remainder can be retained in the oral cavity, and lower digestive tract. Fasting dramatically increases the rate of fluoride absorption to near 100%, from a 60% to 80% when taken with food. Per a 2013 study, it was found that consumption of one litre of tea a day, can potentially supply the daily recommended intake of 4 mg per day. Some lower quality brands can supply up to a 120% of this amount. Fasting can increase this to 150%. The study indicates that tea drinking communities are at an increased risk of dental and skeletal fluorosis, in the case where water fluoridation is in effect. Fluoride ion in low doses in the mouth reduces tooth decay. For this reason, it is used in toothpaste and water fluoridation. At much higher doses and frequent exposure, fluoride causes health complications and can be toxic.

== Applications ==
Fluoride salts and hydrofluoric acid are the main fluorides of industrial value.

=== Organofluorine chemistry ===
Organofluorine compounds are pervasive. Many drugs, many polymers, refrigerants, and many inorganic compounds are made from fluoride-containing reagents. Often fluorides are converted to hydrogen fluoride, which is a major reagent and precursor to reagents. Hydrofluoric acid and its anhydrous form, hydrogen fluoride, are particularly important.

=== Production of metals and their compounds ===
The main uses of fluoride, in terms of volume, are in the production of cryolite, Na_{3}AlF_{6}. It is used in aluminium smelting. Formerly, it was mined, but now it is derived from hydrogen fluoride. Fluorite is used on a large scale to separate slag in steel-making. Mined fluorite (CaF_{2}) is a commodity chemical used in steel-making. Uranium hexafluoride is employed in the purification of uranium isotopes.

=== Cavity prevention ===
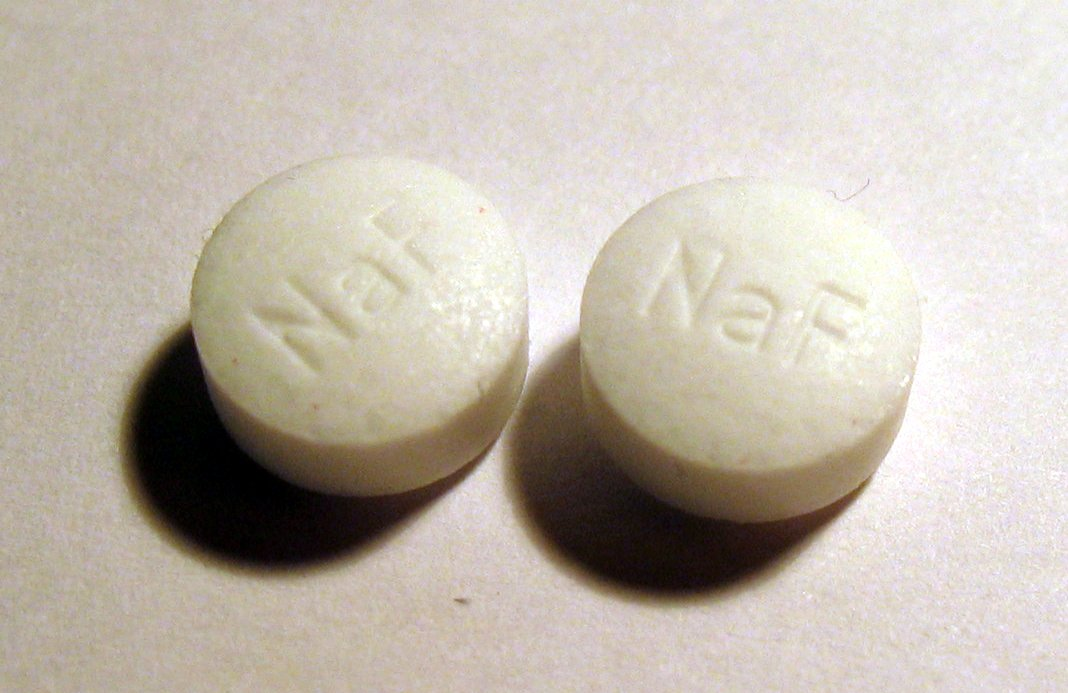
Sodium fluoride sold in tablets for cavity prevention.

Effect of fluoridation on hydroxyapatite in tooth enamel

Fluoride-containing compounds, such as sodium fluoride or sodium monofluorophosphate are used in topical and systemic fluoride therapy for preventing tooth decay. They are used for water fluoridation and in many products associated with oral hygiene. Originally, sodium fluoride was used to fluoridate water; hexafluorosilicic acid (H_{2}SiF_{6}) and its salt sodium hexafluorosilicate (Na_{2}SiF_{6}) are more commonly used additives, especially in the United States. The fluoridation of water is known to prevent tooth decay and is considered by the U.S. Centers for Disease Control and Prevention to be "one of 10 great public health achievements of the 20th century". In some countries where large, centralized water systems are uncommon, fluoride is delivered to the populace by fluoridating table salt. Despite medical consensus as to its safety, fluoridation of water has its critics. Fluoridated toothpaste is in common use. Meta-analysis show the efficacy of 500 ppm fluoride in toothpastes. However, no beneficial effect can be detected when more than one fluoride source is used for daily oral care.

=== Laboratory reagent ===
Fluoride salts are commonly used in biological assay processing to inhibit the activity of phosphatases, such as serine/threonine phosphatases. Fluoride mimics the nucleophilic hydroxide ion in these enzymes' active sites. Beryllium fluoride and aluminium fluoride are also used as phosphatase inhibitors, since these compounds are structural mimics of the phosphate group and can act as analogues of the transition state of the reaction.

== Dietary recommendations ==
The U.S. Institute of Medicine (IOM) updated Estimated Average Requirements (EARs) and Recommended Dietary Allowances (RDAs) for some minerals in 1997. Where there was not sufficient information to establish EARs and RDAs, an estimate designated Adequate Intake (AI) was used instead. AIs are typically matched to actual average consumption, with the assumption that there appears to be a need, and that need is met by what people consume. The current AI for women 19 years and older is 3.0 mg/day (includes pregnancy and lactation). The AI for men is 4.0 mg/day. The AI for children ages 1–18 increases from 0.7 to 3.0 mg/day. The major known risk of fluoride deficiency appears to be an increased risk of bacteria-caused tooth cavities. As for safety, the IOM sets tolerable upper intake levels (ULs) for vitamins and minerals when evidence is sufficient. In the case of fluoride the UL is 10 mg/day. Collectively the EARs, RDAs, AIs and ULs are referred to as Dietary Reference Intakes (DRIs).

The European Food Safety Authority (EFSA) refers to the collective set of information as Dietary Reference Values, with Population Reference Intake (PRI) instead of RDA, and Average Requirement instead of EAR. AI and UL are defined the same as in the United States. For women ages 18 and older the AI is set at 2.9 mg/day (including pregnancy and lactation). For men, the value is 3.4 mg/day. For children ages 1–17 years, the AIs increase with age from 0.6 to 3.2 mg/day. These AIs are comparable to the U.S. AIs. The EFSA reviewed safety evidence and set an adult UL at 7.0 mg/day (lower for children).

For U.S. food and dietary supplement labeling purposes, the amount of a vitamin or mineral in a serving is expressed as a percent of Daily Value (%DV). Although there is information to set Adequate Intake, fluoride does not have a Daily Value and is not required to be shown on food labels.

== Estimated daily intake ==
Daily intakes of fluoride can vary significantly according to the various sources of exposure. Values ranging from 0.46 to 3.6–5.4 mg/day have been reported in several studies (IPCS, 1984). In areas where water is fluoridated this can be expected to be a significant source of fluoride, however fluoride is also naturally present in virtually all foods and beverages at a wide range of concentrations. The maximum safe daily consumption of fluoride is 10 mg/day for an adult (U.S.) or 7 mg/day (European Union).

The upper limit of fluoride intake from all sources (fluoridated water, food, beverages, fluoride dental products and dietary fluoride supplements) is set at 0.10 mg/kg/day for infants, toddlers, and children through to 8 years old. For older children and adults, who are no longer at risk for dental fluorosis, the upper limit of fluoride is set at 10 mg/day regardless of weight.

Examples of fluoride content
Food/Drink	Fluoride (mg per 1000g/ppm)	Portion	Fluoride (mg per portion)
Black tea (brewed)	3.73	Cup of 8 US fl oz (240 mL)	0.884
Raisins, seedless	2.34	Small box, 43 g (1.5 oz)	0.101
Table wine	1.53	Bottle, 750 mL (26 imp fl oz)	1.150
Municipal tap-water, (Fluoridated)	0.81	Recommended daily intake, 3 litres (0.79 US gal)	2.433
Baked potatoes, Russet	0.45	Medium potato, 140 g (0.31 lb)	0.078
Lamb	0.32	Chop, 170 g (6.0 oz)	0.054
Carrots	0.03	1 large carrot, 72 g (2.5 oz)	0.002
Source: Data taken from United States Department of Agriculture, National Nutrient Database

== Safety ==
=== Ingestion ===
According to the United States Department of Agriculture, the Dietary Reference Intakes, which is the "highest level of daily nutrient intake that is likely to pose no risk of adverse health effects" specify 10 mg/day for most people, corresponding to 10 L of fluoridated water with no risk. For young children the values are smaller, ranging from 0.7 mg/d to 2.2 mg/d for infants. Water and food sources of fluoride include community water fluoridation, seafood, tea, and gelatin.

Soluble fluoride salts, of which sodium fluoride is the most common, are toxic, and have resulted in both accidental and self-inflicted deaths from acute poisoning. The lethal dose for most adult humans is estimated at 5 to 10 g (which is equivalent to 32 to 64 mg elemental fluoride per kg body weight). A case of a fatal poisoning of an adult with 4 grams of sodium fluoride is documented, and a dose of 120 g sodium fluoride has been survived. For sodium fluorosilicate (Na_{2}SiF_{6}), the median lethal dose (LD_{50}) orally in rats is 125 mg/kg, corresponding to 12.5 g for a 100 kg adult.

Treatment may involve oral administration of dilute calcium hydroxide or calcium chloride to prevent further absorption, and injection of calcium gluconate to increase the calcium levels in the blood. Hydrogen fluoride is more dangerous than salts such as NaF because it is corrosive and volatile, and can result in fatal exposure through inhalation or upon contact with the skin; calcium gluconate gel is the usual antidote.

In the higher doses used to treat osteoporosis, sodium fluoride can cause pain in the legs and incomplete stress fractures when the doses are too high; it also irritates the stomach, sometimes so severely as to cause ulcers. Slow-release and enteric-coated versions of sodium fluoride do not have gastric side effects in any significant way, and have milder and less frequent complications in the bones. In the lower doses used for water fluoridation, the only clear adverse effect is dental fluorosis, which can alter the appearance of children's teeth during tooth development; this is mostly mild and is unlikely to represent any real effect on aesthetic appearance or on public health. Fluoride was known to enhance bone mineral density at the lumbar spine, but it was not effective for vertebral fractures and provoked more nonvertebral fractures. In areas that have naturally occurring high levels of fluoride in groundwater which is used for drinking water, both dental and skeletal fluorosis can be prevalent and severe.

==== Hazard maps for fluoride in groundwater ====
Around one-third of the human population drinks water from groundwater resources. Of this, about 10%, approximately 300 million people, obtain water from groundwater resources that are heavily contaminated with arsenic or fluoride. These trace elements derive mainly from minerals. Maps locating potential problematic wells are available.

=== Topical ===
Concentrated fluoride solutions are corrosive. Gloves made of nitrile rubber are worn when handling fluoride compounds. The hazards of solutions of fluoride salts depend on the concentration. In the presence of strong acids, fluoride salts release hydrogen fluoride, which is corrosive, especially toward glass.

== Other derivatives ==
Organic and inorganic anions are produced from fluoride, including:

- Bifluoride, used as an etchant for glass
- Tetrafluoroberyllate
- Hexafluoroplatinate
- Tetrafluoroborate used in organometallic synthesis
- Hexafluorophosphate used as an electrolyte in commercial secondary batteries.
- Trifluoromethanesulfonate
- Hexafluoroantimonate
- Hexafluorouranate

== See also ==
- Per- and polyfluoroalkyl substances
- Fluorine-19 nuclear magnetic resonance spectroscopy
- Fluoride deficiency
- Fluoride selective electrode
- Fluoride therapy
- Sodium monofluorophosphate
