= Uranium fluoride =

Uranium fluoride can refer to:

- Uranium trifluoride, UF_{3}
- Uranium tetrafluoride, UF_{4}
- Uranium pentafluoride, UF_{5}
- Uranium hexafluoride, UF_{6}
- Tetrauranium heptadecafluoride, U_{4}F_{17}
- Tetrauranium octadecafluoride, U_{4}F_{18}

== See also ==
- Uranyl fluoride, UO_{2}F_{2}
