= Dental fluorosis =

Tooth enamel discoloration due to excessive fluoride ingestion

- Other names: Mottled enamel
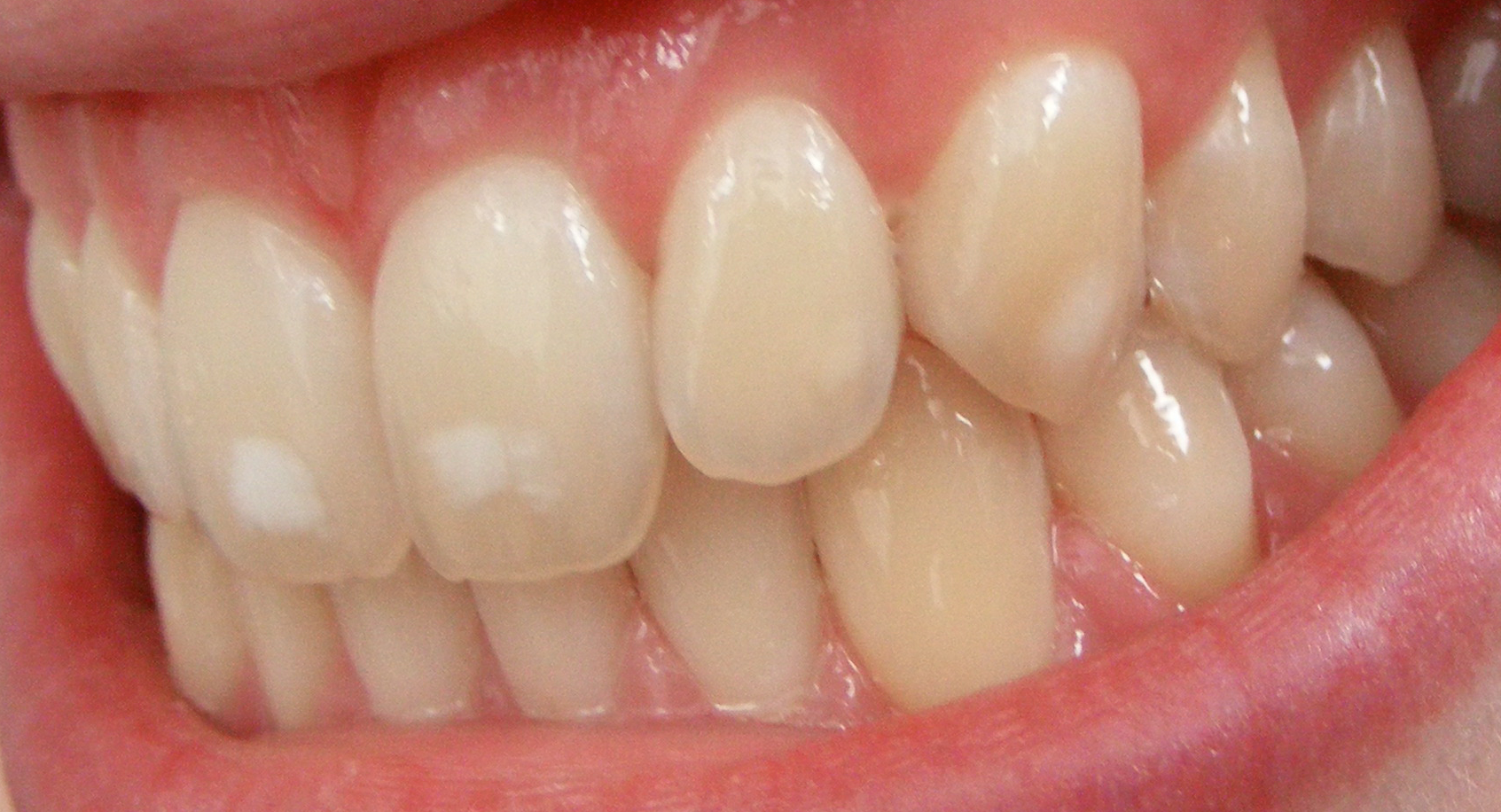
- Mild fluorosis: in its usual mildest form, fluorosis appears as opaque white patches on the enamel
- Specialty: Dentistry

Dental fluorosis is a common disorder, characterized by hypocalcification of tooth enamel caused by ingestion of excessive fluoride during enamel formation.

Dental fluorosis appears as a range of visual changes in enamel causing degrees of intrinsic tooth discoloration, and, in some cases, physical damage to the teeth. The severity of the condition is dependent on the dose, duration, and age of the individual during the exposure. The "very mild" (and most common) form of fluorosis, is characterized by small, opaque, "paper white" areas scattered irregularly over the tooth, covering less than 25% of the tooth surface. In the "mild" form of the disease, these mottled patches can involve up to half of the surface area of the teeth. When fluorosis is moderate, all of the surfaces of the teeth are mottled and teeth may be ground down and brown stains frequently "disfigure" the teeth. Severe fluorosis is characterized by brown discoloration and discrete or confluent pitting; brown stains are widespread and teeth often present a corroded-looking appearance.

People with fluorosis are relatively resistant to dental caries (tooth decay caused by bacteria), although there may be cosmetic concern. In moderate to severe fluorosis, teeth are weakened and suffer permanent physical damage.

== Diagnosis ==
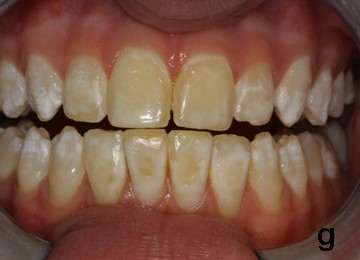
Amelogenesis imperfecta: this condition can be mistaken for fluorosis

The adequate diagnosis of fluorosis can be diagnosed by visual clinical examination. This requires inspection of dry and clean tooth surfaces under a good lighting. There are individual variations in clinical fluorosis manifestation which are highly dependent on the duration, timing, and dosage of fluoride exposure. There are different classifications to diagnose the severity based on the appearances. The clinical manifestation of mild dental fluorosis is mostly characterised a snow flaking appearance that lack a clear border, opaque, white spots, narrow white lines following the perikymata or patches as the opacities may coalesce with an intact, hard and smooth enamel surface on most of the teeth. With increasing severity, the subsurface enamel, all along the tooth becomes more porous. Enamel may appear yellow/brown with discolouration and/or many pitted white-brown lesions similar to cavities. They are often described as "mottled teeth". Fluorosis does not cause discolouration to the enamel directly, as upon eruption into the mouth, affected permanent teeth are not discoloured yet. In dental enamel, fluorosis causes subsurface porosity or hypomineralizations, which extend toward the dentinal-enamel junction as the condition progresses and the affected teeth become more susceptible to staining. Due to diffusion of exogenous ions (e.g., iron and copper), stains develop into the increasingly and abnormally porous enamel.

The differential diagnosis for this condition includes:

- Turner's hypoplasia (although this is usually more localized)
- Molar-Incisor-Hypomineralisation
- Some mild forms of amelogenesis imperfecta and enamel hypoplasia
- Enamel defects caused by infection of a primary tooth predecessor
- Dental caries: Fluorosis-resembling enamel defects are often misdiagnosed as dental caries.
- Dental trauma: Mechanical trauma to the primary tooth may cause disturbance to the maturation phase of enamel formation, which may result in enamel opacities on the permanent successors.

== Classification ==
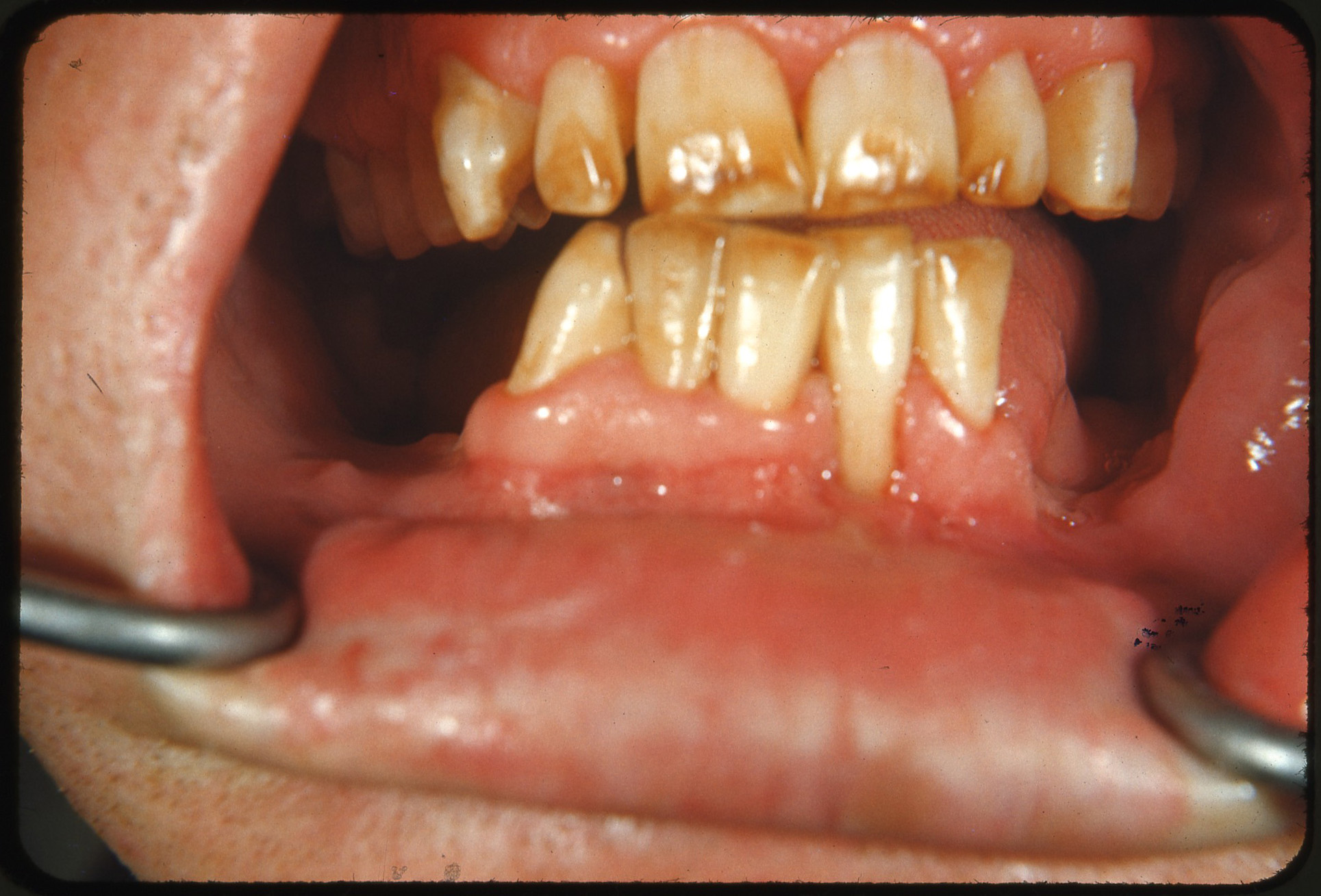
Severe fluorosis: brown discolored and mottled enamel of an individual from a region with high levels of naturally occurring fluoride

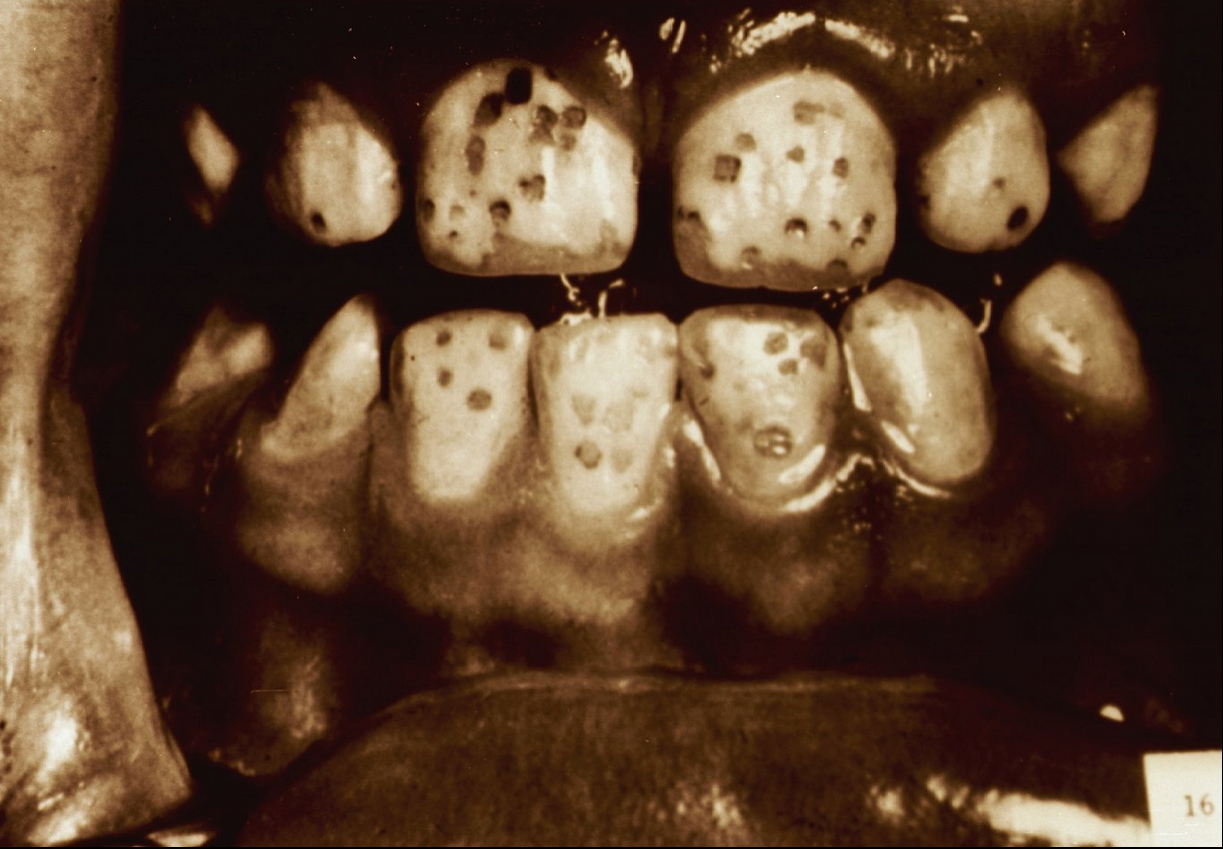
Severe fluorosis: the enamel is pitted and discolored

The two main classification systems are described below. Others include the tooth surface fluorosis index (Horowitz et al. 1984), which combines Deans index and the TF index; and the fluorosis risk index (Pendrys 1990), which is intended to define the time at which fluoride exposure occurs, and relates fluorosis risk with tooth development stage.

=== Dean's index ===
Dean's fluorosis index was first published in 1934 by H. Trendley Dean. The index underwent two changes, appearing in its final form in 1942. An individual's fluorosis score is based on the most severe form of fluorosis found on two or more teeth.

Classification	Code	Criteria – description of enamel
Normal	0	The enamel represents the usual translucent semivitriform (glass-like) type of structure. The surface is smooth, glossy and usually of pale creamy white color
Questionable	1	The enamel discloses slight aberrations from the translucency of normal enamel, ranging from a few white flecks to occasional white spots. This classification is utilised in those instances where a definite diagnosis is not warranted and a classification of 'normal' not justified
Very Mild	2	Small, opaque, paper white areas scattered irregularly over the tooth but not involving as much as approximately 25% of the tooth surface. Frequently included in this classification are teeth showing no more than about 1 – 2mm of white opacity at the tip of the summit of the cusps, of the bicuspids or second molars.
Mild	3	The white opaque areas in the enamel of the teeth are more extensive but do not involve as much as 50% of the tooth.
Moderate	4	All enamel surfaces of the teeth are affected and surfaces subject to attrition show wear. Brown stain is frequently a disfiguring feature
Severe	5	All enamel surfaces are affected and hypoplasia is so marked that the general form of the tooth may be affected. The major diagnostic sign of this classification is discrete or confluent pitting. Brown stains are widespread and teeth often present a corroded-like appearance.

=== TF index ===
Proposed by Thylstrup and Fejerskov in 1978, the TF index represents a logical extension of Dean's index, incorporating modern understanding of the underlying pathology of fluorosis. It scores the spectrum of fluorotic changes in enamel from 0 to 9, allowing more precise definition of mild and severe cases.

== Causes ==
Dental fluorosis is caused by a higher than normal amount of fluoride ingestion whilst teeth are forming. Primary dentine fluorosis and enamel fluorosis can only happen during tooth formation, so fluoride exposure occurs in childhood. Enamel fluorosis has a white opaque appearance which is due to the surface of the enamel being hypomineralised.

The most superficial concern in dental fluorosis is aesthetic changes in the permanent dentition (the adult teeth). The period when these teeth are at highest risk of developing fluorosis is between when the child is born up to 6 years old, though there has been some research which proposes that the most crucial course is during the first 2 years of the child's life. From roughly 7 years old thereafter, most children's permanent teeth would have undergone complete development (except their wisdom teeth), and therefore their susceptibility to fluorosis is greatly reduced, or even insignificant, despite the amount of intake of fluoride. The severity of dental fluorosis depends on the amount of fluoride exposure, the age of the child, individual response, weight, degree of physical activity, nutrition, and bone growth. Individual susceptibility to fluorosis is also influenced by genetic factors.

Excess fluoride can be absorbed form a number of natural and artificial sources. Dental fluorosis is most common in areas where water contains naturally excessive fluoride levels (over 1.7ppm) but the exact level of fluoride required to cause dental fluorosis is unknown since fluoride can be absorbed from multiple sources like crops and soil, water, and supplements. Fluorosis has been observed at a variety of concentrations and is thought to be exacerbated by malnutrition. Consumption of fluoridated toothpaste and fluoride supplements are not strongly correlated with increased risk of dental fluorosis, but there is a tentative inverse relationship between fluorosis and breastfeeding. Consumption of crops grown with naturally highly fluoridated water may increase the chance of fluorosis. If the water supply is fluoridated at the level of 1 ppm, one must consume one litre of water in order to take in 1 mg of fluoride. It is thus improbable a person will receive more than the tolerable upper limit from consuming optimally fluoridated water alone.

Dental fluorosis grew in the United States following the artificial fluoridation of municipal water supplies between 1949 and 2013. Multiple organizations reported an incidence of mild and extremely-mild dental fluorosis, which peaked in the United States in between 2011 and 2013. The Centers for Disease Control reported an increase of dental fluorosis between 1986 and 2014: very-mild-fluorosis increased from 17.2% to 28.5% and mild-fluorosis increased from 4.1% to 8.6%. The prevalence of moderate- and severe-fluorosis increased from 1.3% to 3.6%. A 2011-12 NHANES documented another 31% overall increase among American teens since the previous decade. Researchers hypothesize the increase in fluoridation seen in the United States was due over-consumption of fluoride (e.g. a combination of increased consumption of fluoridated water, toothpaste, and dental varnishes), but professional organizations do not recommend children use "low fluoride" toothpaste. Hong Kong decreased their levels of fluoridation in 1978 by 0.2ppm to combat dental fluorosis and reported a 17% drop in reported cases.

In November 2006 the American Dental Association published information stating that water fluoridation is safe, effective and healthy; that enamel fluorosis is usually mild and difficult for anyone except a dental healthcare professional to see; and that it can result from ingesting more than optimal amounts of fluoride in early childhood. The ADA recommends consulting a dentist or pediatrician to optimize fluoride intake.

In July 2015, the U.S. Public Health Service lowered the recommended water fluoridation level from 0.7-1.2ppm to just 0.7ppm. The previous limit was developed in 1962 when fluoride toothpaste and varnishes were much less common. These previous recommendation also changed based on local average air temperature. In 2015, after years of review, the level was adjusted on the belief that the same reduction in dental caries could be obtained while lowering the number of cases of dental fluorosis (90% of which is classified as mild or extremely-mild). Community water fluoridation remains one of the most effective methods of reducing cavities in children and adolescences.

== Mechanism ==
There are a few possible mechanisms that have been proposed. The most popular is that the hypomineralization of affected enamel is mainly due to in-situ toxic effects of the fluoride on the ameloblasts in the enamel formation. General effects of fluoride on the calcium metabolism, or oversaturation effects that suppress the fluoride metabolism, are alternate explanations. However, despite decades of research, there have yet to be any studies that substantiate a mechanism of alteration in the mineralisation that takes place when fluoride interacts with mineralising tissues.

In the extra-cellular environment of maturing enamel, an excess of fluoride ions alters the rate at which enamel matrix proteins (amelogenin) are enzymatically broken down and the rate at which the subsequent breakdown products are removed. Fluoride may also indirectly alter the action of protease via a decrease in the availability of free calcium ions in the mineralization environment. This results in the formation of enamel with less mineralization. This hypomineralized enamel has altered optical properties and appears opaque and lusterless relative to normal enamel.

Traditionally severe fluorosis has been described as enamel hypoplasia, however, hypoplasia does not occur as a result of fluorosis. The pits, bands, and loss of areas of enamel seen in severe fluorosis are the result of damage to severely hypomineralized, brittle, and fragile enamel.

== Management ==
Dental fluorosis may or may not be of cosmetic concern. In some cases, there may be varying degrees of negative psychosocial effects. The treatment options are:

- Mild cases: Tooth bleaching
- Moderate cases: Enamel microabrasion (outer affected layer of enamel is abraded in an acidic environment)
- Severe cases: Composite fillings, Micro-abrasion, Veneers, Crowns

== Epidemiology ==
Fluorosis is common in the United States, with 41% of adolescents having definite fluorosis, and another 20% "questionably" having fluorosis according to the Center of Disease Control. As of 2005 surveys conducted by the National Institute of Dental and Craniofacial Research in the USA between 1986 and 1987 and by the Center of Disease Control between 1999 and 2004 are the only national sources of data concerning the prevalence of dental fluorosis. Before the 1999-2004 study was published, CDC published an interim report covering data from 1999 to 2002.

CDC findings on children and adolescents
Deans Index	2002
Questionable fluorosis	11.5%
Very mild fluorosis	21.68%
Mild fluorosis	6.59%
Moderate to severe fluorosis	3.26%
Total confirmed fluorosis prevalence	31.65%
Total confirmed and questionable fluorosis prevalence	43.15%

Dietary reference intakes for fluoride
Age group	Reference weight kg (lb)	Adequate intake (mg/day)	Tolerable upper intake (mg/day)
Infants 0–6 months	7 (16)	0.01	0.7
Infants 7–12 months	9 (20)	0.5	0.9
Children 1–3 years	13 (29)	0.7	1.3
Children 4–8 years	22 (48)	1.0	2.2
Children 9–13 years	40 (88)	2.0	10
Boys 14–18 years	64 (142)	3.0	10
Girls 14–18 years	57 (125)	3.0	10
Males 19 years and over	76 (166)	4.0	10
Females 19 years and over	61 (133)	3.0	10

== History ==
In ancient times, Galen describes what is thought to be dental fluorosis. However, it was not until the early 20th century that dental fluorosis became increasingly recognized and scientifically studied.

In 1901 Eager published the first description of the "mottled enamel" of immigrants from a small village near Naples, Italy. He writes that the condition is called "Denti di Chiaie" (Chiaie teeth), named after Stefano Chiaie, an Italian professor. In the United States of America, a dentist, Frederick McKay, set up practice in Colorado Springs in 1901 and discovered a high proportion of the residents had stained teeth, locally termed the "Colorado brown stain". He took this information to Greene Vardiman Black, a prominent American dentist of the time. After examining specimens of affected enamel, in 1916 Black described the condition as "[a]n endemic imperfection of the enamel of the teeth, heretofore unknown in the literature of dentistry." They made the interesting observation that although the mottled enamel was hypomineralized, and therefore should be more susceptible to decay, this was not the case. Gradually, they became aware of existing and further reports of a similar condition worldwide.

In 1931, 3 different groups of scientists around the world published their discoveries that this condition was caused by fluoride in drinking water during childhood. The condition then started to become termed "dental fluorosis". Through epidemiological studies in the US, Henry Trendley Dean helped to identify a causal link between high concentrations of fluoride in the drinking water and mottled enamel. He also produced a classification system for dental fluorosis that is still used in modern times, Dean's Index. As research continued, the protective effect of fluoride against dental decay was demonstrated.

== See also ==
- Skeletal fluorosis
- Fluoride toxicity
