= Skeletal fluorosis =

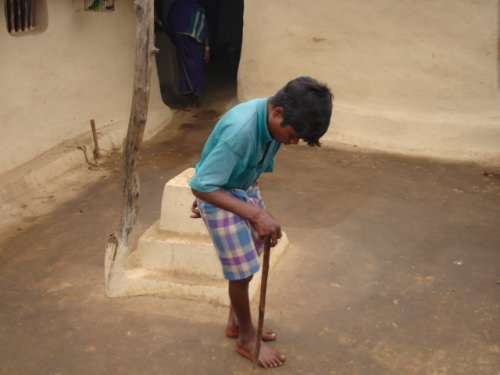
- Fluorosis patient in the industrial city of Raigarh, India
- Specialty: Rheumatology

Skeletal fluorosis is a bone disease caused by excessive accumulation of fluoride leading to weakened bones. In advanced cases, skeletal fluorosis causes painful damage to bones and joints. Symptoms include the increased frequency of fractures and impaired joint mobility. Side effects include ruptures of the stomach lining and nausea. Fluoride can also damage the parathyroid glands, leading to hyperparathyroidism, and a higher blood calcium concentration. Common causes of fluorosis include the inhalation of fluoride dust or fumes by workers in industry and consumption of drinking water with unsafe fluoride levels. Fluorosis can also occur as a result of volcanic activity. As of now, there are no established treatments for skeletal fluorosis patients. However, it is reversible in some cases, depending on the progression of the disease. Fluorosis is most widespread in India and China.

== Symptoms ==
Symptoms are mainly promoted in the bone structure. Due to a high fluoride concentration in the body, the bone is hardened and thus less elastic, resulting in an increased frequency of fractures. Other symptoms include thickening of the bone structure and accumulation of bone tissue, which both contribute to impaired joint mobility. Ligaments and cartilage can become ossified. Most patients with skeletal fluorosis show side effects from the high fluoride dose such as ruptures of the stomach lining and nausea. Fluoride can also damage the parathyroid glands, leading to hyperparathyroidism, the uncontrolled secretion of parathyroid hormones. These hormones regulate calcium concentration in the body. An elevated parathyroid hormone concentration results in a depletion of calcium in bone structures and thus a higher calcium concentration in the blood.

The clinical symptoms of fluoride toxicity in the bones are indistinguishable from arthritis. Even low level exposure to fluoride can cause or worsen the symptoms in consumers with vulnerable genotypes.

== Causes ==
Common causes of fluorosis include inhalation of fluoride dusts or fumes by workers in industry and consumption of fluoride from drinking water (levels of fluoride in excess of levels that are considered safe.)

In India, especially the Nalgonda region (Telangana), a common cause of fluorosis is fluoride-rich drinking water that is sourced from deep-bore wells. Over half of groundwater sources in India have fluoride above recommended levels.

Fluorosis can also occur as a result of volcanic activity. The 1783 eruption of the Laki volcano in Iceland is estimated to have killed about 22% of the Icelandic population, and 60% of livestock, as a result of fluorosis and sulfur dioxide gases. The 1693 eruption of Hekla, another Icelandic volcano, also led to fatalities of livestock under similar conditions.

=== Skeletal fluorosis phases ===
Osteosclerotic phase	Ash concentration (mgF/kg)	Symptoms and signs
Normal Bone	500 to 1,000	Normal
Preclinical Phase	3,500 to 5,500	Asymptomatic; slight radiographically-detectable increases in bone mass
Clinical Phase I	6,000 to 7,000	Sporadic pain; stiffness of joints; osteosclerosis of pelvis and vertebral column
Clinical Phase II	7,500 to 9,000	Chronic joint pain; arthritic symptoms; slight calcification of ligaments' increased osteosclerosis and cancellous bones; with/without osteoporosis of long bones
Clinical Phase III	8,400	Limitation of joint movement; calcification of ligaments of neck vertebral column; crippling deformities of the spine and major joints; muscle wasting; neurological defects/compression of spinal cord

== Treatment ==
As of now, there are no established treatments for skeletal fluorosis patients. However, it is reversible in some cases, depending on the progression of the disease. If fluorine intake is stopped, the amount in bone will decrease and be excreted via urine. However, it is a very slow process to eliminate the fluorine from the body completely. Minimal results are seen in patients. Treatment of side effects is also very difficult. For example, a patient with a bone fracture cannot be treated according to standard procedures, because the bone is very brittle. In this case, recovery will take a very long time and a pristine healing cannot be guaranteed. However, further fluorosis can be prevented by drinking defluoridated water. It is recently suggested that drinking of defluoridated water from the "calcium amended-hydroxyapatite" defluoridation method may help in the fluorosis reversal. Defluoridated water from this suggested method provides calcium-enriched alkaline drinking water as generally fluoride contaminated water has a low amount of calcium mineral and drinking alkaline water helps in eliminating the toxic fluoride from the body.

== Epidemiology ==
In some areas, skeletal fluorosis is endemic. While fluorosis is most severe and widespread in the world's two most populous countries – India and China – UNICEF estimates that "fluorosis is endemic in at least 25 countries across the globe. The total number of people affected is not known, but a conservative estimate would number in the tens of millions."

In India, 20 states have been identified as endemic areas, with an estimated 60 million people at risk and 6 million people disabled; about 600,000 might develop a neurological disorder as a consequence.

== Effects on animals ==
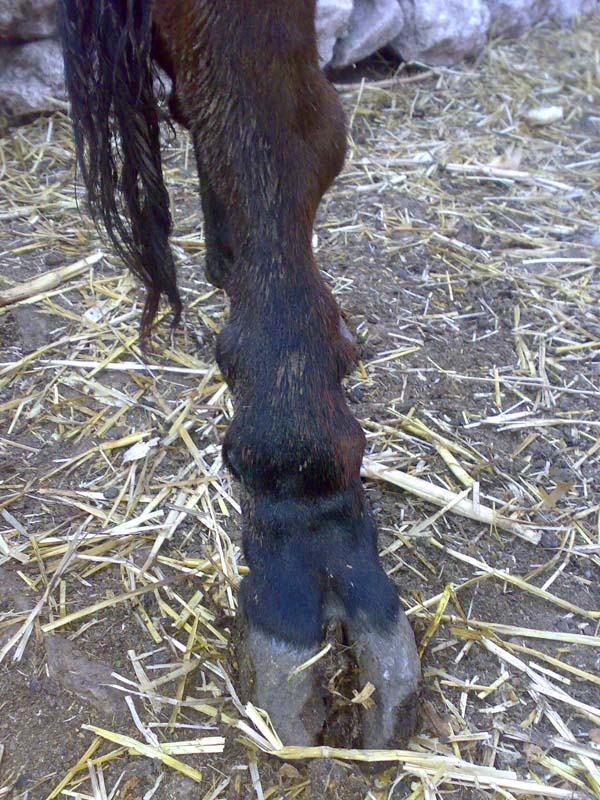
Moroccan cow with fluorosis

The histological changes which are induced through fluorine on rats resemble those of humans.

== See also ==
- Dental fluorosis
- Fluoride poisoning
- Kaj Roholm
