= Fluoride toxicity =

Condition in which there are elevated levels of the fluoride ion in the body

- Other names: Fluoride poisoning
- Specialty: Emergency medicine, toxicology

Fluoride toxicity is a condition in which there are elevated levels of the fluoride ion in the body. Although fluoride is safe for dental health at low concentrations, sustained consumption of large amounts of soluble fluoride salts is dangerous. Referring to a common salt of fluoride, sodium fluoride (NaF), the lethal dose for most adult humans is estimated at 5 to 10 g (which is equivalent to 32 to 64 mg elemental fluoride/kg body weight). Ingestion of fluoride can produce gastrointestinal discomfort at doses at least 15 to 20 times lower (0.2–0.3 mg/kg or 10 to 15 mg for a 50 kg person) than lethal doses. Although it is helpful topically for dental health in low dosage, chronic ingestion of fluoride in large amounts interferes with bone formation. In this way, the most widespread examples of fluoride poisoning arise from consumption of ground water that is abnormally fluoride-rich, however, this is a rare circumstance and is often localised to regions with naturally high fluoride levels in ground water.

== Recommended levels ==
For optimal dental health, the World Health Organization recommends a level of fluoride from 0.5 to 1.0 mg/L (milligrams per liter), depending on climate. Fluorosis becomes possible above this recommended dosage. As of 2015, the United States Health and Human Services Department recommends a maximum of 0.7 milligrams of fluoride per liter of water – updating and replacing the previous recommended range of 0.7 to 1.2 milligrams issued in 1962. The new recommended level is intended to reduce the occurrence of dental fluorosis while maintaining water fluoridation.

== Toxicity ==
=== Chronic ===
Geographical areas associated with groundwater having over 1.5 mg/L of naturally occurring fluoride, which is above recommended levels.

In India an estimated 60 million people have been poisoned by well water contaminated by naturally produced excessive fluoride, which was dissolved from the granite rocks. The effects are particularly evident in the bone deformities of children. Similar or larger problems are anticipated in other countries including China, Uzbekistan, and Ethiopia.

=== Acute ===
Historically, most cases of acute fluoride toxicity have followed accidental ingestion of sodium fluoride based insecticides or rodenticides. Currently, in advanced countries, most cases of fluoride exposure are due to the ingestion of dental fluoride products. Other sources include glass-etching or chrome-cleaning agents like ammonium bifluoride or hydrofluoric acid, industrial exposure to fluxes used to promote the flow of a molten metal on a solid surface, volcanic ejecta (for example, in cattle grazing after an 1845–1846 eruption of Hekla and the 1783–1784 flood basalt eruption of Laki), and metal cleaners. Malfunction of water fluoridation equipment has happened several times, including a notable incident in Alaska.

== Occurrence ==
=== Organofluorine compounds ===
Twenty percent of modern pharmaceuticals contain fluorine. These organofluorine compounds are not sources of fluoride poisoning, as the carbon–fluorine bond is too strong to release fluoride.

==== Fluoride in toothpaste ====
Children may experience gastrointestinal distress upon ingesting excessive amounts of flavored toothpaste. Between 1990 and 1994, over 628 people, mostly children were treated after ingesting too much fluoride-containing toothpaste. "While the outcomes were generally not serious," gastrointestinal symptoms appear to be the most common problem reported. However given the low concentration of fluoride in dental products, this is potentially due to the consumption of other major components.

==== Fluoride in drinking water ====
Around one-third of the world's population drinks water from groundwater resources. Of this, about 10 percent, approximately 300 million people, obtains water from groundwater resources that are heavily contaminated with arsenic or fluoride. These trace elements derive mainly from leaching of minerals. Maps are available for locations of potential problematic wells via the Groundwater Assessment Platform (GAP).

== Effects ==
Excess fluoride consumption has been studied as a factor in the following:

=== Brain ===
Some research has suggested that high levels of fluoride exposure may adversely affect neurodevelopment in children, but the evidence is of insufficient quality to allow any firm conclusions to be drawn.

In 2024, a U.S. government study released by HHS found higher levels of fluoride exposure, such as drinking water containing more than 1.5 mg/L (which is the recommended safe limit set by the WHO), are associated with lower IQ in children. The associated meta-analysis was published in 2025. It reports a null association when concentration is less than 1.5 mg/L. Among studies that reported IQ-point differences, each additional 1 mg/L in urinary fluoride concentration was associated with a 1.63 point decrease in IQ (1.14 points if only low risk-of-bias studies are used).

=== Bones ===
Whilst fluoridated water is associated with decreased levels of fractures in a population, toxic levels of fluoride have been associated with a weakening of bones and an increase in hip and wrist fractures. The U.S. National Research Council concludes that fractures with fluoride levels 1–4 mg/L, suggesting a dose-response relationship, but states that there is "suggestive but inadequate for drawing firm conclusions about the risk or safety of exposures at [2 mg/L]".

Consumption of fluoride at levels beyond those used in fluoridated water for a long period of time causes skeletal fluorosis. In some areas, particularly the Asian subcontinent, skeletal fluorosis is endemic. It is known to cause irritable-bowel symptoms and joint pain. Early stages are not clinically obvious, and may be misdiagnosed as (seronegative) rheumatoid arthritis or ankylosing spondylitis.

=== Kidney ===
Fluoride induced nephrotoxicity is kidney injury due to toxic levels of serum fluoride, commonly due to release of fluoride from fluorine-containing drugs, such as methoxyflurane.

Within the recommended dose, no effects are expected, but chronic ingestion in excess of 12 mg/day are expected to cause adverse effects, and an intake that high is possible when fluoride levels are around 4 mg/L. Those with impaired kidney function are more susceptible to adverse effects.

The kidney injury is characterised by failure to concentrate urine, leading to polyuria, and subsequent dehydration with hypernatremia and hyperosmolarity. Inorganic fluoride inhibits adenylate cyclase activity required for antidiuretic hormone effect on the distal convoluted tubule of the kidney. Fluoride also stimulates intrarenal vasodilation, leading to increased medullary blood flow, which interferes with the counter current mechanism in the kidney required for concentration of urine.

Fluoride induced nephrotoxicity is dose dependent, typically requiring serum fluoride levels exceeding 50 micromoles per liter (about 1 ppm) to cause clinically significant renal dysfunction, which is likely when the dose of methoxyflurane exceeds 2.5 MAC hours. (Note: "MAC hour" is the multiple of the minimum alveolar concentration (MAC) of the anesthetic used times the number of hours the drug is administered, a measure of the dosage of inhaled anesthetics.)

Elimination of fluoride depends on glomerular filtration rate. Thus, patients with chronic kidney disease will maintain serum fluoride for a longer period of time, leading to increased risk of fluoride induced nephrotoxicity.

=== Teeth ===
The only generally accepted adverse effect of fluoride at levels used for water fluoridation is dental fluorosis, which can alter the appearance of children's teeth during tooth development; this is mostly mild and usually only an aesthetic concern. Compared to unfluoridated water, fluoridation to 1 mg/L is estimated to cause fluorosis in one of every 6 people (range 4–21), and to cause fluorosis of aesthetic concern in one of every 22 people (range 13.6–∞).

=== Thyroid ===
Fluoride's suppressive effect on the thyroid is more severe when iodine is deficient, and fluoride is associated with lower levels of iodine. Thyroid effects in humans were associated with fluoride levels 0.05–0.13 mg/kg/day when iodine intake was adequate and 0.01–0.03 mg/kg/day when iodine intake was inadequate. Its mechanisms and effects on the endocrine system remain unclear.

Testing on mice shows that the medication gamma-Aminobutyric acid (GABA) can be used to treat fluoride toxicity of the thyroid and return normal function.

=== Effects on aquatic organisms ===
Fluoride accumulates in the bone tissues of fish and in the exoskeleton of aquatic invertebrates. The mechanism of fluoride toxicity in aquatic organisms is believed to involve the action of fluoride ions as enzymatic poisons. In soft waters with low ionic content, invertebrates and fishes may develop adverse effects from fluoride concentration as low as 0.5 mg/L. Negative effects are less in hard waters and seawaters, as the bioavailability of fluoride ions is reduced with increasing water hardness Seawater contains fluoride at a concentration of 1.3 mg/L.

== Mechanism ==
Like most soluble materials, fluoride compounds are readily absorbed by the stomach and intestines, and excreted through the urine. Urine tests have been used to ascertain rates of excretion in order to set upper limits in exposure to fluoride compounds and associated detrimental health effects. Ingested fluoride initially acts locally on the intestinal mucosa, where it forms hydrofluoric acid in the stomach.
