= Water fluoridation =

Addition of fluoride to a water supply to reduce tooth decay

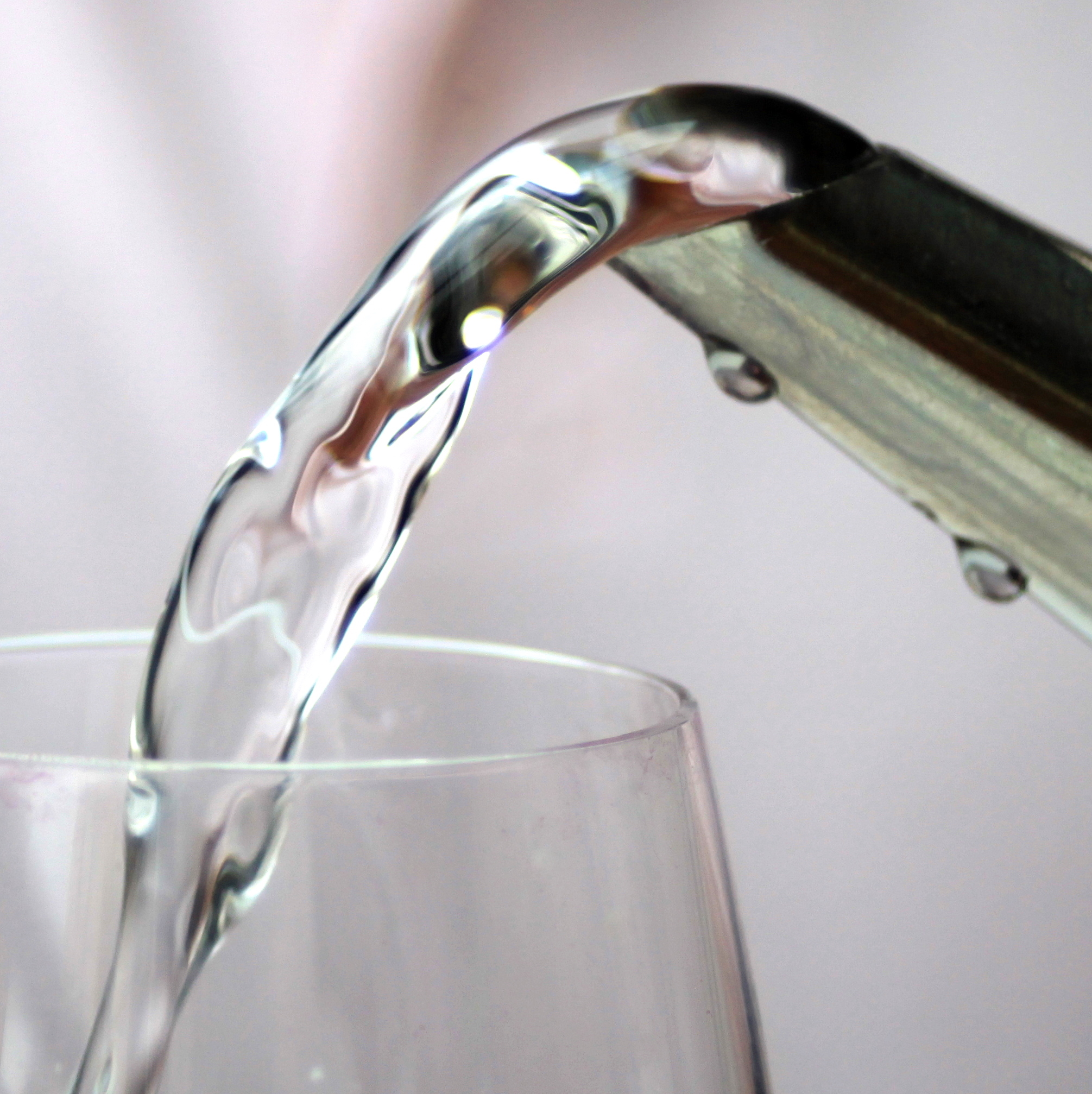
Fluoridation does not affect the appearance, taste or smell of drinking water.

Water fluoridation is the controlled addition of fluoride to public water supplies to reduce tooth decay. Fluoridated water maintains fluoride levels effective for cavity prevention, achieved naturally or through supplementation. In the mouth, fluoride slows tooth enamel demineralization and enhances remineralization in early-stage cavities. Defluoridation is necessary when natural fluoride exceeds recommended limits. The World Health Organization (WHO) recommends fluoride levels of 0.5–1.5 mg/L, depending on climate and other factors. In the U.S., the recommended level has been 0.7 mg/L since 2015, lowered from 1.2 mg/L. Bottled water often has unknown fluoride levels.

Tooth decay affects 60–90% of schoolchildren worldwide. Fluoridation reduces cavities in children, with Cochrane reviews estimating reductions of 35% in baby teeth and 26% in permanent teeth when no other fluoride sources are available, though efficacy in adults is less clear. In Europe and other regions, declining decay rates are attributed to topical fluorides and alternatives like salt fluoridation and nano-hydroxyapatite.

The United States was the first country to engage in water fluoridation, and 72% of its population drinks fluoridated water as of 2022. Globally, 5.4% of people receive fluoridated water, though its use remains rare in Europe, except in Ireland and parts of Spain. The WHO, FDI World Dental Federation, and the United States' Centers for Disease Control and Prevention endorse fluoridation as safe and effective at recommended levels. Critics question its risks, efficacy, and ethical implications.

== Goal ==
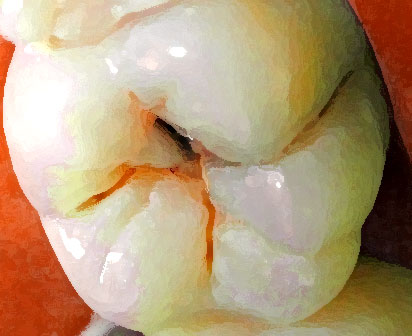
A cavity starts in a tooth's outer enamel and spreads to the dentin and pulp inside.

The goal of water fluoridation is to prevent tooth decay by adjusting the concentration of fluoride in public water supplies. Tooth decay (dental caries) is one of the most prevalent chronic diseases worldwide. Although it is rarely life-threatening, tooth decay can cause pain and impair eating, speaking, facial appearance, and acceptance into society, and it greatly affects the quality of life of children, particularly those of low socioeconomic status. In most industrialized countries, tooth decay affects 60–90% of schoolchildren and the vast majority of adults; although the problem appears to be less in Africa's developing countries, it is expected to increase in several countries there because of changing diet and inadequate fluoride exposure. In the U.S., minorities and the poor both have higher rates of decayed and missing teeth, and their children have less dental care. Once a cavity occurs, the tooth's fate is that of repeated restorations, with estimates for the median life of an amalgam tooth filling ranging from 9 to 14 years. Oral disease is the fourth most expensive disease to treat. The motivation for fluoridation of salt or water is similar to that of iodized salt for the prevention of congenital hypothyroidism and goiter.

The goal of water fluoridation is to prevent a chronic disease whose burdens particularly fall on children and the poor. Another of the goals was to bridge inequalities in dental health and dental care. Some studies suggest that fluoridation reduces oral health inequalities between the rich and poor, but the evidence is limited. There is anecdotal but not scientific evidence that fluoride allows more time for dental treatment by slowing the progression of tooth decay, and that it simplifies treatment by causing most cavities to occur in pits and fissures of teeth. Other reviews have found not enough evidence to determine if water fluoridation reduces oral-health social disparities.

Health and dental organizations worldwide have endorsed its safety and effectiveness at recommended levels. Its use began in 1945, following studies of children in a region where higher levels of fluoride occur naturally in the water. Further research showed that moderate fluoridation prevents tooth decay.

== Implementation ==
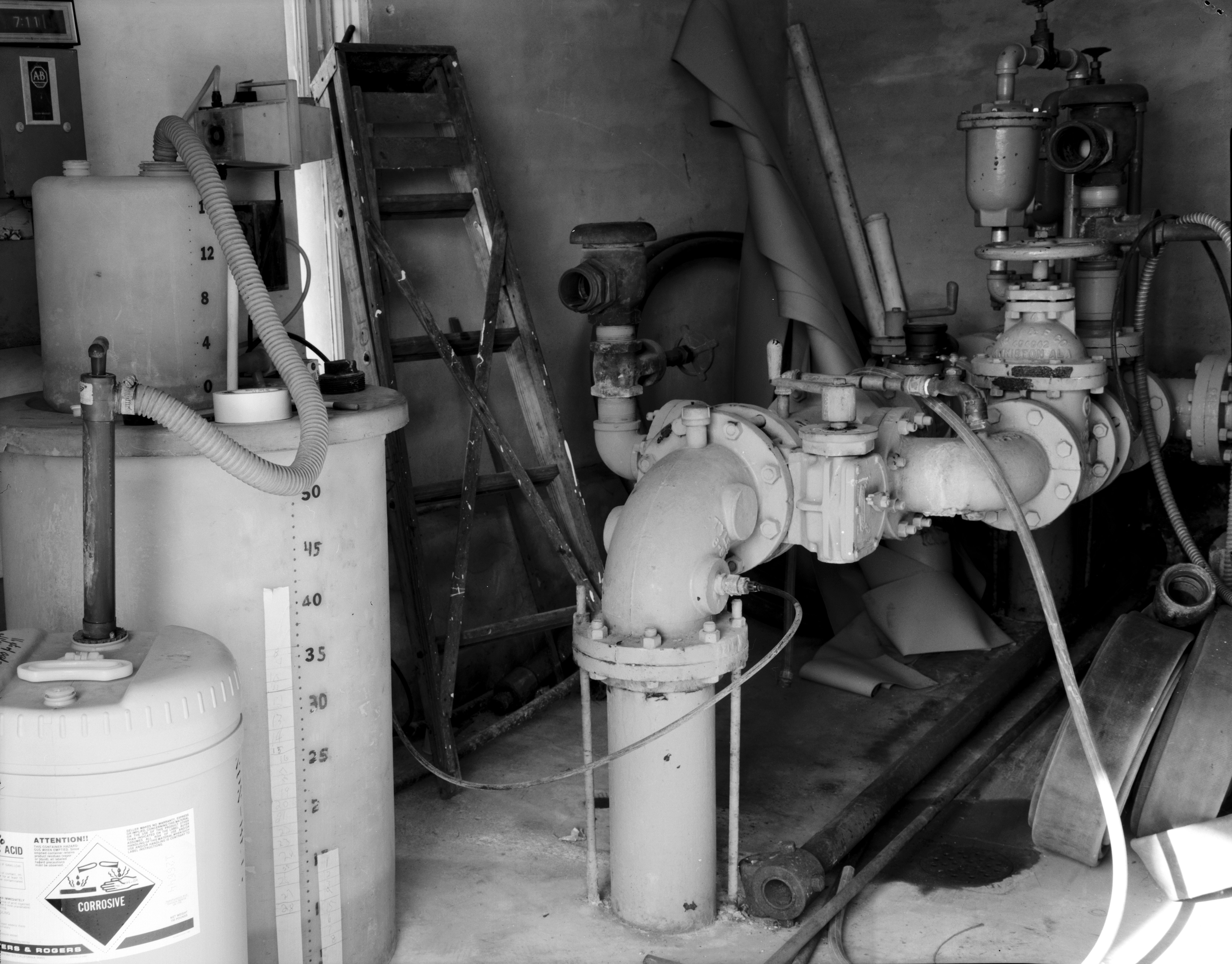
Fluoride monitor (at left) in a community water tower pumphouse, Minnesota, 1987

Fluoridation does not affect the appearance, taste, or smell of drinking water. It is normally accomplished by adding one of three compounds to the water: sodium fluoride, fluorosilicic acid, or sodium fluorosilicate.

- Sodium fluoride (NaF) was the first compound used and is the reference standard. It is a white, odorless powder or crystal; the crystalline form is preferred if manual handling is used, as it minimizes dust. It is more expensive than the other compounds, but is easily handled and is usually used by smaller utility companies. It is toxic in gram quantities by ingestion or inhalation.
- Fluorosilicic acid (H_{2}SiF_{6}) is the most commonly used additive for water fluoridation in the United States. It is an inexpensive liquid by-product of phosphate fertilizer manufacture. It comes in varying strengths, typically 23–25%; because it contains so much water, shipping can be expensive. It is also known as hexafluorosilicic, hexafluosilicic, hydrofluosilicic, and silicofluoric acid.
- Sodium fluorosilicate (Na_{2}SiF_{6}) is the sodium salt of fluorosilicic acid. It is a powder or very fine crystal that is easier to ship than fluorosilicic acid. It is also known as sodium silicofluoride.

These compounds were chosen for their solubility, safety, availability, and low cost. A 1992 census found that, for U.S. public water supply systems reporting the type of compound used, 63% of the population received water fluoridated with fluorosilicic acid, 28% with sodium fluorosilicate, and 9% with sodium fluoride.

=== Occurrences ===
Geographical areas associated with groundwater having over 1.5 mg/L of naturally occurring fluoride, which is above recommended levels

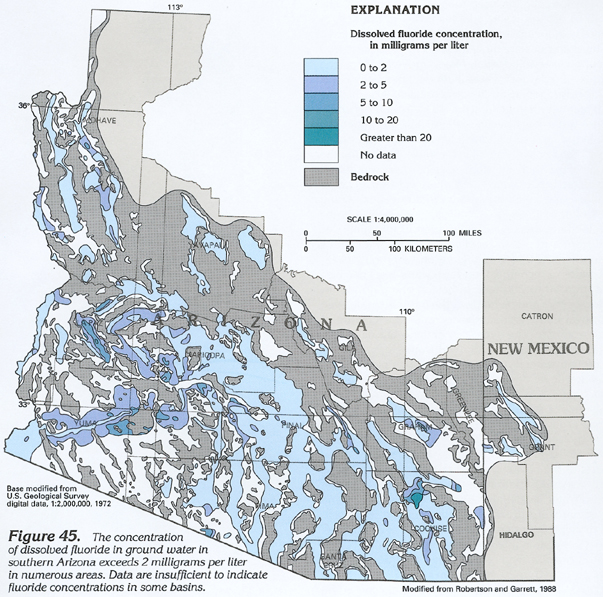
Detail of southern Arizona. Areas in darker blues have groundwater with over 2 mg/L of naturally occurring fluoride.

Fluoride naturally occurring in water can be above, at, or below recommended levels. Rivers and lakes generally contain fluoride levels less than 0.5 mg/L, but groundwater, particularly in volcanic or mountainous areas, can contain as much as 50 mg/L. Higher concentrations of fluorine are found in alkaline volcanic, hydrothermal, sedimentary, and other rocks derived from highly evolved magmas and hydrothermal solutions, and this fluorine dissolves into nearby water as fluoride. In most drinking waters, over 95% of total fluoride is the F^{−} ion, with the magnesium–fluoride complex (MgF^{+}) being the next most common. Because fluoride levels in water are usually controlled by the solubility of fluorite (CaF_{2}), high natural fluoride levels are associated with calcium-deficient, alkaline, and soft waters.

Some bottled waters contain undeclared fluoride, which can be present naturally in source waters, or if water is sourced from a public supply which has been fluoridated. The United States Food and Drug Administration (FDA) states that bottled water products labeled as de-ionized, purified, demineralized, or distilled have been treated in such a way that they contain no or only trace amounts of fluoride, unless they specifically list fluoride as an added ingredient.

=== Recommendations ===
==== Target level ====
Authorities such as the World Health Organization publish recommendations for the amount of fluoride in piped water. The lower bound is set to reduce the incidence of dental caries and the upper bound is set to prevent harms such dental fluorosis. Levels below this range can be increased by water fluoridation and levels above this range should be reduced using treatment technology. The WHO upper limit ("guideline value") of 1.5 mg/L has been repeatedly reaffirmed since 1984. The WHO mentions that the upper limit may need to be reduced in setting some national standards to keep the consumption below 6 mg/day. This can happen in case of higher piped water consumption such as in warmer climates, or when other sources of fluoride (e.g. food, air and dental preparations) are present. In 2011, the WHO reports that protection against dental caries begin at 0.5 mg/L and that most fluoridation standards target a range of 0.5–1.0 mg/L. The WHO itself does not give a target for fluoridation.

The European Food Safety Authority's Panel on Dietetic Products, Nutrition and Allergies (NDA) considers fluoride not to be an essential nutrient, yet, due to the beneficial effects of dietary fluoride on prevention of dental caries they have defined an Adequate Intake (AI) value (Note: This link points to the American DRI article, but the concepts for AI and UL are the same between European and American dietary recommendations. The European counterpart tor DRI is Dietary Reference Value.) for it. The AI of fluoride from all sources (including non-dietary sources) is 0.05 mg/kg body weight per day for both children and adults, including pregnant and lactating women. Applying the 60 kg adult assumption, this is equivalent to 3 mg/day. (This assumption is repeatedly used in the 2011 WHO report to derive limits for non-fluoride substances, with 74 total occurrences.) The EFSA has an upper legal limit for fluoride content in water at 1.5 mg/L. In 2024 it prepared a draft for the tolerable upper intake levels (UL) for daily fluoride consumption in children.

In 2011, the U.S. Department of Health and Human Services (HHS) and the U.S. Environmental Protection Agency (EPA) lowered the recommended level of fluoride to 0.7 mg/L. In 2015, the U.S. FDA, based on the recommendation of the U.S. Public Health Service (PHS) for fluoridation of community water systems, recommended that bottled water manufacturers limit fluoride in bottled water to no more than 0.7 milligrams per liter (mg/L; equivalent to parts per million).

A 2007 Australian systematic review recommended a range from 0.6 to 1.1 mg/L.

===== Historical USA recommendations =====
Pre-2011 US recommendations were based on evaluations from 1962, when the U.S. specified the optimal level of fluoride in water to range from 0.7 to 1.2 mg/L, depending on the average maximum daily air temperature; the optimal level is lower in warmer climates, where people drink more water, and is higher in cooler climates.

Between 1974 and 1989, fluoride was listed as an essential nutrient by the U.S. National Research Council. In 1989, it removed this designation due to the lack of studies showing it is essential for human growth, though still considering fluoride a "beneficial element" due to its positive impact on oral health. Studies in the late 1980s and the early 1990s indicate that childhood fluoride intake is around 0.05 mg/kg body weight per day when fluoridated and 0.03 mg/kg/day when not.

==== Methods to reach target level ====
In the United States, the Centers for Disease Control and Prevention developed recommendations for water fluoridation that specify requirements for personnel, reporting, training, inspection, monitoring, surveillance, and actions in case of overfeed, along with technical requirements for each major compound used.

The WHO recommends reaching the adequate level of fluoride intake through fluoridation of low fluoride water (or of milk or salt) as well as topical fluoride preparations including fluoridated toothpastes, silver diamine fluoride varnish, and glass ionomer cement. The WHO also recommends that excess intake be avoided by switching to an alternative water source if possible, or through defluoridating techniques.

Defluoridation is needed when the naturally occurring fluoride level exceeds recommended limits. It can be accomplished by percolating water through granular beds of activated alumina, bone meal, bone char, or tricalcium phosphate; by coagulation with alum; or by precipitation with lime. Clay can also be used for defluoridation, but one must first ensure it contains no toxic chemicals or other pollutants.

Pitcher or faucet-mounted water filters do not alter fluoride content; the more-expensive reverse osmosis filters remove 65–95% of fluoride, and distillation removes all fluoride.

== Evidence ==
Existing evidence suggests that water fluoridation reduces tooth decay. Consistent evidence also suggests that it can cause dental fluorosis, most of which is mild and not usually of aesthetic concern. No clear evidence of other adverse effects exists, though almost all research thereof has been of poor quality.

=== Effectiveness ===
Reviews have shown that water fluoridation reduces cavities in children. A conclusion for the efficacy in adults is less clear with some reviews finding benefit and others not. Studies in the U.S. in the 1950s and 1960s showed that water fluoridation reduced childhood cavities by fifty to sixty percent, while studies in 1989 and 1990 showed lower reductions (40% and 18% respectively), likely due to increasing use of fluoride from other sources, notably toothpaste, and also the 'halo effect' of food and drink that is made in fluoridated areas and consumed in unfluoridated ones.

A 2000 UK systematic review (York) found that water fluoridation was associated with a decreased proportion of children with cavities of 15% and with a decrease in decayed, missing, and filled primary teeth (average decreases was 2.25 teeth). The review found that the evidence was of moderate quality: few studies attempted to reduce observer bias, control for confounding factors, report variance measures, or use appropriate analysis. Although no major differences between natural and artificial fluoridation were apparent, the evidence was inadequate for a conclusion about any differences. A 2007 Australian systematic review used the same inclusion criteria as York's, plus one additional study. This did not affect the York conclusions. A 2011 European Commission systematic review based its efficacy on York's review conclusion. A 2015 Cochrane systematic review estimated a reduction in cavities when water fluoridation was used by children who had no access to other sources of fluoride to be 35% in baby teeth and 26% in permanent teeth. The evidence was of poor quality. A 2020 study in the Journal of Political Economy found that water fluoridation significantly improved dental health and labor market outcomes, but had non-significant effects on cognitive ability.

Fluoride may also prevent cavities in adults of all ages. A 2007 meta-analysis by CDC researchers found that water fluoridation prevented an estimated 27% of cavities in adults, about the same fraction as prevented by exposure to any delivery method of fluoride (29% average). A 2011 European Commission review found that the benefits of water fluoridation for adult in terms of reductions in decay are limited. A 2015 Cochrane review found no conclusive research regarding the effectiveness of water fluoridation in adults. A 2016 review found variable quality evidence that, overall, stopping of community water fluoridation programs was typically followed by an increase in cavities.

Most countries in Europe have experienced substantial declines in cavities without the use of water fluoridation due to the introduction of fluoridated toothpaste and the large use of other fluoride-containing products, including mouthrinse, dietary supplements, and professionally applied or prescribed gel, foam, or varnish. For example, in Finland and Germany, tooth decay rates remained stable or continued to decline after water fluoridation stopped in communities with widespread fluoride exposure from other sources. Fluoridation is however still clearly necessary in the U.S. because unlike most European countries, the U.S. does not have school-based dental care, many children do not visit a dentist regularly, and for many U.S. children water fluoridation is the primary source of exposure to fluoride. The effectiveness of water fluoridation can vary according to circumstances such as whether preventive dental care is free to all children.

=== Fluorosis ===
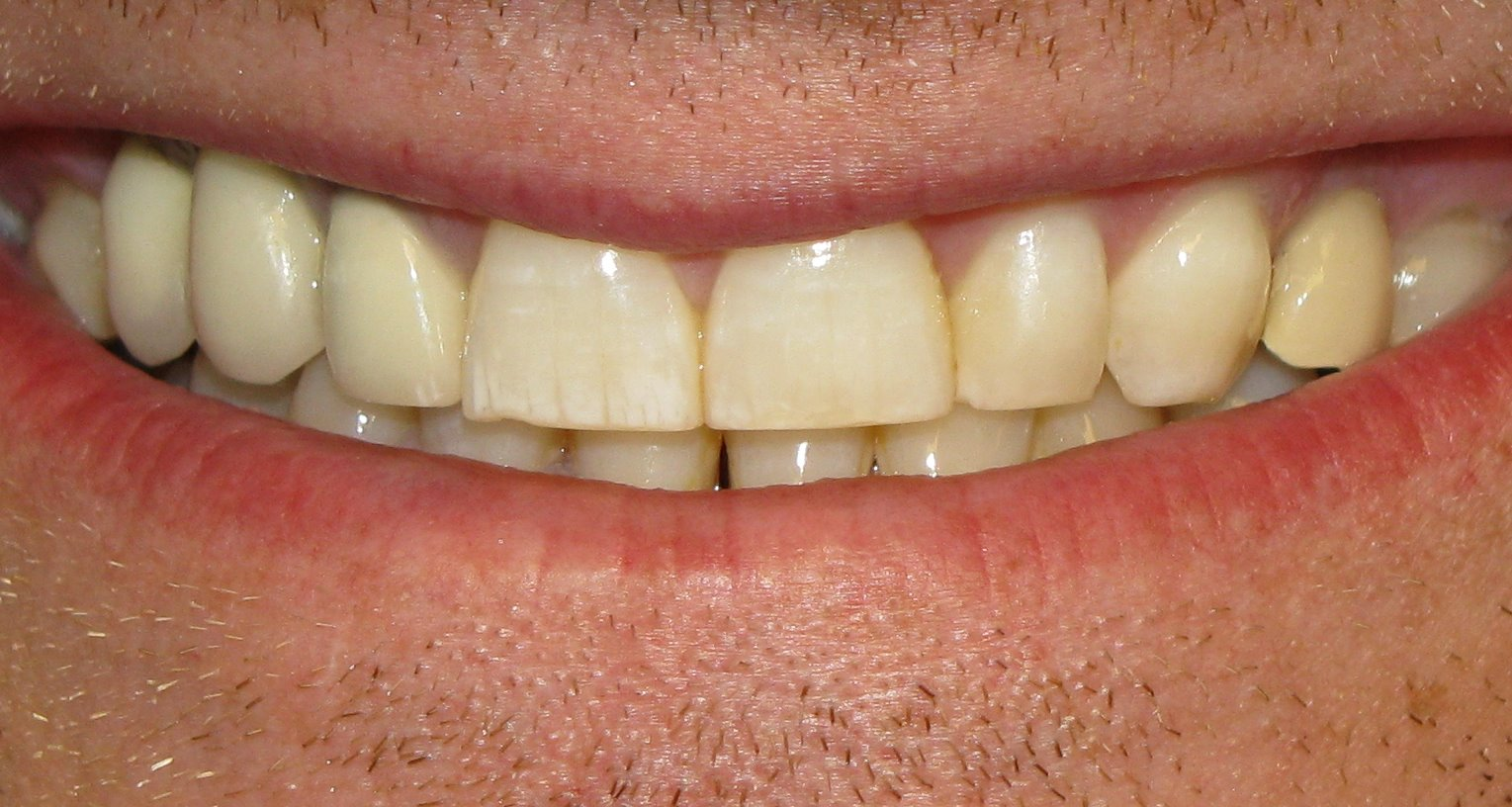
A mild case of dental fluorosis, visible as white streaks on the subject's upper right central incisor

Fluoride's adverse effects depend on total fluoride dosage from all sources. At the commonly recommended dosage, the only clear adverse effect is dental fluorosis, which can alter the appearance of children's teeth during tooth development; this is mostly mild and is unlikely to represent any real effect on aesthetic appearance or on public health. In April 2015, recommended fluoride levels in the United States were changed to 0.7 ppm from 0.7 to 1.2 ppm to reduce the risk of dental fluorosis. The 2015 Cochrane review estimated that for a fluoride level of 0.7 ppm the percentage of participants with fluorosis of aesthetic concern was approximately 12%. This increases to 40% when considering fluorosis of any level not of aesthetic concern. In the US mild or very mild dental fluorosis has been reported in 20% of the population, moderate fluorosis in 2% and severe fluorosis in less than 1%.

The critical period of exposure is between ages one and four years, with the risk ending around age eight. Fluorosis can be prevented by monitoring all sources of fluoride, with fluoridated water directly or indirectly responsible for an estimated 40% of risk and other sources, notably toothpaste, responsible for the remaining 60%. Compared to water naturally fluoridated at 0.4 mg/L, fluoridation to 1 mg/L is estimated to cause additional fluorosis in one of every 6 people (95% CI 4–21 people), and to cause additional fluorosis of aesthetic concern in one of every 22 people (95% CI 13.6–∞ people). Here, aesthetic concern is a term used in a standardized scale based on what adolescents would find unacceptable, as measured by a 1996 study of British 14-year-olds. In many industrialized countries the prevalence of fluorosis is increasing even in unfluoridated communities, mostly because of fluoride from swallowed toothpaste. A 2009 systematic review indicated that fluorosis is associated with consumption of infant formula or of water added to reconstitute the formula, that the evidence was distorted by publication bias, and that the evidence that the formula's fluoride caused the fluorosis was weak. In the U.S. the decline in tooth decay was accompanied by increased fluorosis in both fluoridated and unfluoridated communities; accordingly, fluoride has been reduced in various ways worldwide in infant formulas, children's toothpaste, water, and fluoride-supplement schedules.

=== Safety ===
Fluoridation has little effect on risk of bone fracture (broken bones); it may result in slightly lower fracture risk than either excessively high levels of fluoridation or no fluoridation.

There is no clear association between water fluoridation and cancer or deaths due to cancer, both for cancer in general and also specifically for bone cancer and osteosarcoma. Series of research concluded that concentration of fluoride in water does not associate with osteosarcoma. The beliefs regarding association of fluoride exposure and osteosarcoma stem from a study from the NTP in 1990, which showed uncertain evidence of association of fluoride and osteosarcoma in male rats. But there is still no solid evidence of cancer-causing tendency of fluoride in mice. Fluoridation of water has been practiced around the world to improve citizens' dental health. It is also deemed as major health success. Fluoride concentration levels in water supplies are regulated, such as United States Environmental Protection Agency regulates fluoride levels to not be greater than 4 milligrams per liter. Water from natural sources contains some fluoride, but many communities chose to add more to the point that it can reduce tooth decay. Fluoride is also known for its ability to cause new bone formation. Yet, further research shows no osteosarcoma risks from fluoridated water in humans. Most of the research involved counting number of osteosarcoma patients cases in particular areas which has difference concentrations of fluoride in drinking water. The statistic analysis of the data shows no significant difference in occurrences of osteosarcoma cases in different fluoridated regions. Another important research involved collecting bone samples from osteosarcoma patients to measure fluoride concentration and compare them to bone samples of newly diagnosed malignant bone tumors. The result is that the median fluoride concentrations in bone samples of osteosarcoma patients and tumor controls are not significantly different. Fluoride exposures of osteosarcoma patients are also proven to be not significantly different from healthy people. More recent studies have disputed any relationship to consumption of fluoridated drinking water during childhood.

Fluoride can occur naturally in water in concentrations well above recommended levels, which can have several long-term adverse effects, including severe dental fluorosis, skeletal fluorosis, and weakened bones; water utilities in the developed world reduce fluoride levels to regulated maximum levels in regions where natural levels are high, and the WHO and other groups work with countries and regions in the developing world with naturally excessive fluoride levels to achieve safe levels. The World Health Organization recommends a guideline maximum fluoride value of 1.5 mg/L as a level at which fluorosis should be minimal.

In rare cases improper implementation of water fluoridation can result in overfluoridation that causes outbreaks of acute fluoride poisoning, with symptoms that include nausea, vomiting, and diarrhea. Three such outbreaks were reported in the U.S. between 1991 and 1998, caused by fluoride concentrations as high as 220 mg/L; in the 1992 Alaska outbreak, 262 people became ill and one person died. In 2010, approximately 60 gallons of fluoride were released into the water supply in Asheboro, North Carolina in 90 minutes—an amount that was intended to be released in a 24-hour period.

Like other common water additives such as chlorine, hydrofluosilicic acid and sodium silicofluoride decrease pH and cause a small increase of corrosivity, but this problem is easily addressed by increasing the pH. Although it has been hypothesized that hydrofluosilicic acid and sodium silicofluoride might increase human lead uptake from water, a 2006 statistical analysis did not support concerns that these chemicals cause higher blood lead concentrations in children. Trace levels of arsenic and lead may be present in fluoride compounds added to water, but no credible evidence exists that their presence is of concern: concentrations are below measurement limits.

The effect of water fluoridation on the natural environment has been investigated, and although some claim that no adverse effects have been established, other items find evidence of harm or of concern. Issues studied have included fluoride concentrations in groundwater and downstream rivers; lawns, gardens, and plants; consumption of plants grown in fluoridated water; air emissions; and equipment noise.

== Mechanism ==
Effect of fluoridation on hydroxyapatite in tooth enamel

Fluoride exerts its major effect by interfering with the demineralization mechanism of tooth decay. Tooth decay is an infectious disease, the key feature of which is an increase within dental plaque of bacteria such as Streptococcus mutans and Lactobacillus. These produce organic acids when carbohydrates, especially sugar, are eaten. When enough acid is produced to lower the pH below 5.5, the acid dissolves carbonated hydroxyapatite, the main component of tooth enamel, in a process known as demineralization. After the sugar is gone, some of the mineral loss can be recovered—or remineralized—from ions dissolved in the saliva. Cavities result when the rate of demineralization exceeds the rate of remineralization, typically in a process that requires many months or years.

Demineralization and remineralization of dental enamel in the presence of acid and fluoride in saliva and plaque fluid

All fluoridation methods, including water fluoridation, create low levels of fluoride ions in saliva and plaque fluid, thus exerting a topical or surface effect. A person living in an area with fluoridated water may experience rises of fluoride concentration in saliva to about 0.04 mg/L several times during a day. Technically, this fluoride does not prevent cavities but rather controls the rate at which they develop. When fluoride ions are present in plaque fluid along with dissolved hydroxyapatite, and the pH is higher than 4.5, a fluorapatite-like remineralized veneer is formed over the remaining surface of the enamel; this veneer is much more acid-resistant than the original hydroxyapatite, and is formed more quickly than ordinary remineralized enamel would be. The cavity-prevention effect of fluoride is mostly due to these surface effects, which occur during and after tooth eruption. Although some systemic (whole-body) fluoride returns to the saliva via blood plasma, and to unerupted teeth via plasma or crypt fluid, there is little data to determine what percentages of fluoride's anticavity effect comes from these systemic mechanisms. Also, although fluoride affects the physiology of dental bacteria, its effect on bacterial growth does not seem to be relevant to cavity prevention.

Fluoride's effects depend on the total daily intake of fluoride from all sources. About 70–90% of ingested fluoride is absorbed into the blood, where it distributes throughout the body. In infants 80–90% of absorbed fluoride is retained, with the rest excreted, mostly via urine; in adults about 60% is retained. About 99% of retained fluoride is stored in bone, teeth, and other calcium-rich areas, where excess quantities can cause fluorosis. Drinking water is typically the largest source of fluoride. In many industrialized countries swallowed toothpaste is the main source of fluoride exposure in unfluoridated communities. Other sources include dental products other than toothpaste; air pollution from fluoride-containing coal or from phosphate fertilizers; trona, used to tenderize meat in Tanzania; and tea leaves, particularly the tea bricks favored in parts of China. High fluoride levels have been found in other foods, including barley, cassava, corn, rice, taro, yams, and fish protein concentrate. The U.S. Institute of Medicine has established Dietary Reference Intakes for fluoride: Adequate Intake values range from 0.01 mg/day for infants aged 6 months or less, to 4 mg/day for men aged 19 years and up; and the Tolerable Upper Intake Level is 0.10 mg/kg/day for infants and children through age 8 years, and 10 mg/day thereafter. A rough estimate is that an adult in a temperate climate consumes 0.6 mg/day of fluoride without fluoridation, and 2 mg/day with fluoridation. However, these values differ greatly among the world's regions: for example, in Sichuan, China the average daily fluoride intake is only 0.1 mg/day in drinking water but 8.9 mg/day in food and 0.7 mg/day directly from the air due to the use of high-fluoride soft coal for cooking and drying foodstuffs indoors.

== Alternatives ==
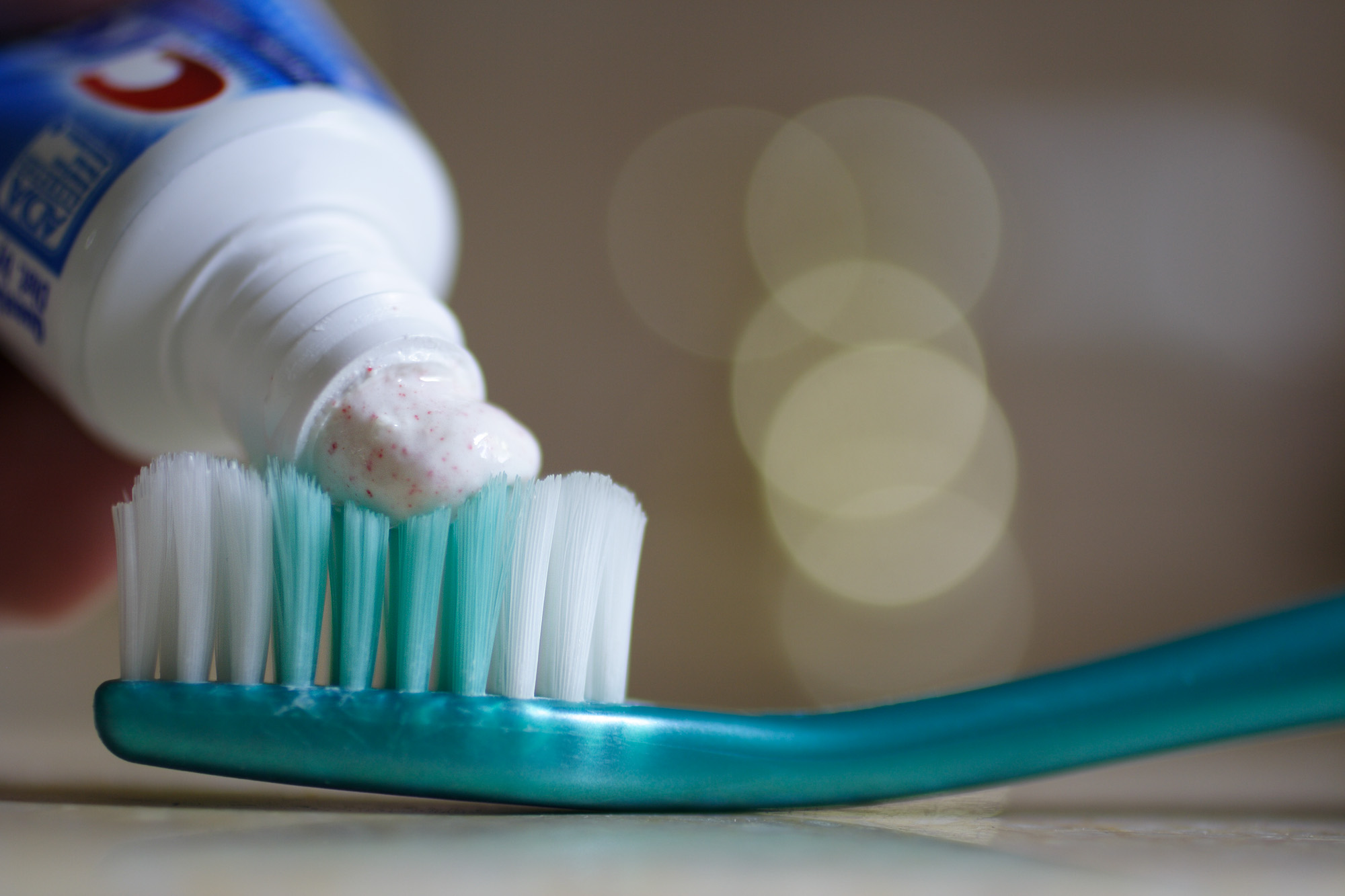
Fluoride toothpaste is effective against cavities. It is widely used, but less so among the poor.

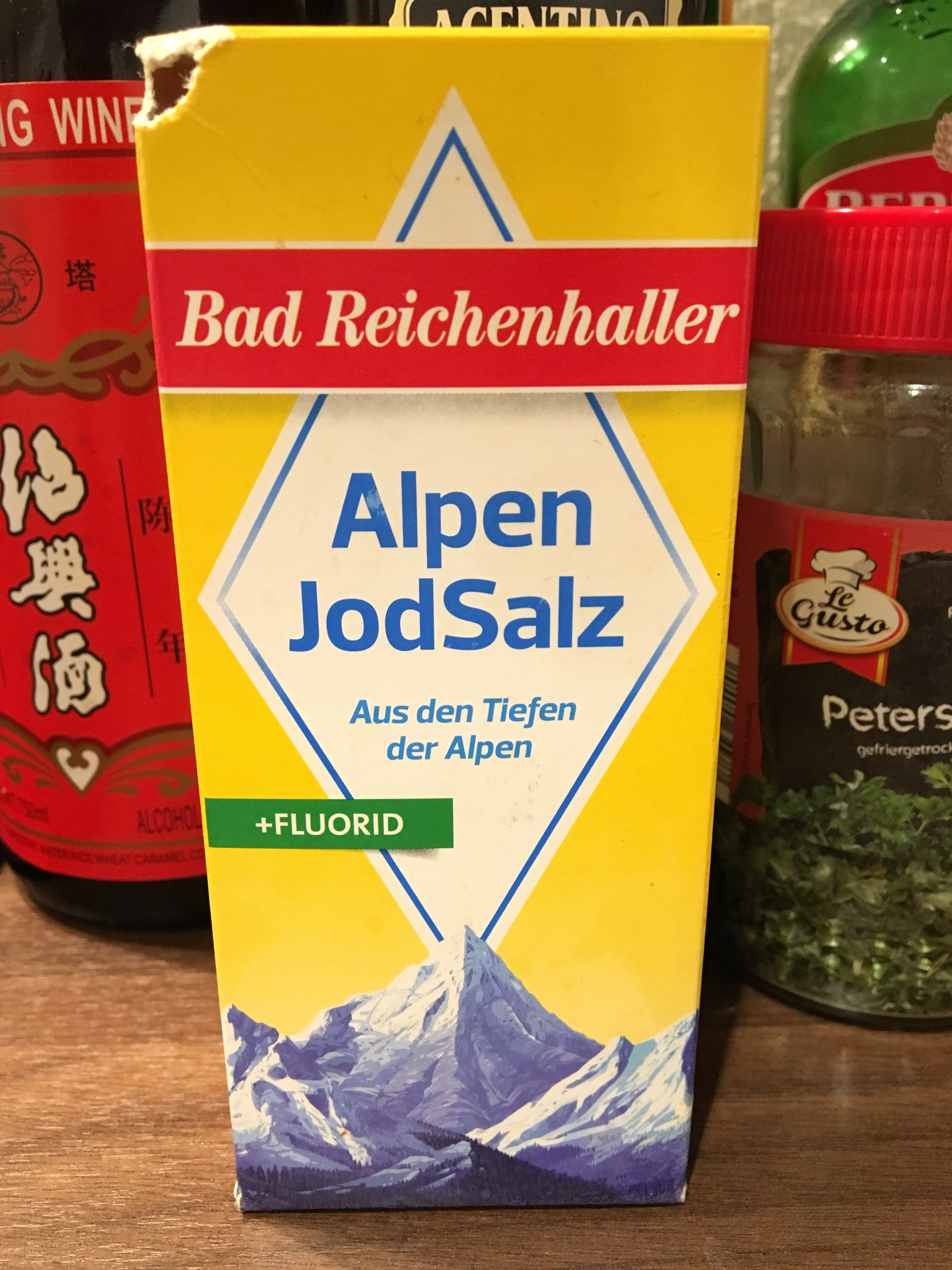
Fluoridated iodized salt sold in Germany

The views on the most effective method for community prevention of tooth decay are mixed. The Australian government review states that water fluoridation is the most effective means of achieving fluoride exposure that is community-wide. The European Commission review states "No obvious advantage appears in favour of water fluoridation compared with topical prevention". Other fluoride therapies are also effective in preventing tooth decay; they include fluoride toothpaste, mouthwash, gel, and varnish, and fluoridation of salt and milk. Dental sealants are effective as well, with estimates of prevented cavities ranging from 33% to 86%, depending on age of sealant and type of study.

Fluoride toothpaste is the most widely used and rigorously evaluated fluoride treatment. Its introduction is considered the main reason for the decline in tooth decay in industrialized countries, and toothpaste appears to be the single common factor in countries where tooth decay has declined. Toothpaste is the only realistic fluoride strategy in many low-income countries, where lack of infrastructure renders water or salt fluoridation infeasible. It relies on individual and family behavior, and its use is less likely among lower economic classes; in low-income countries it is unaffordable for the poor. Fluoride toothpaste prevents about 25% of cavities in young permanent teeth, and its effectiveness is improved if higher concentrations of fluoride are used, or if the toothbrushing is supervised. Fluoride mouthwash and gel are about as effective as fluoride toothpaste; fluoride varnish prevents about 45% of cavities. By comparison, brushing with a nonfluoride toothpaste has little effect on cavities.

The effectiveness of salt fluoridation is about the same as that of water fluoridation, if most salt for human consumption is fluoridated. Fluoridated salt reaches the consumer in salt at home, in meals at school and at large kitchens, and in bread. For example, Jamaica has just one salt producer, but a complex public water supply; it started fluoridating all salt in 1987, achieving a decline in cavities. Universal salt fluoridation is also practiced in Colombia and the Swiss Canton of Vaud; in Germany fluoridated salt is widely used in households but unfluoridated salt is also available, giving consumers a choice. Concentrations of fluoride in salt range from 90 to 350 mg/kg, with studies suggesting an optimal concentration of around 250 mg/kg.

Milk fluoridation is practiced by the Borrow Foundation in some parts of Bulgaria, Chile, Peru, Russia, Macedonia, Thailand and the UK. Depending on location, the fluoride is added to milk, to powdered milk, or to yogurt. For example, milk powder fluoridation is used in rural Chilean areas where water fluoridation is not technically feasible. These programs are aimed at children, and have neither targeted nor been evaluated for adults. A systematic review found low-quality evidence to support the practice, but also concluded that further studies were needed.

Other public-health strategies to control tooth decay, such as education to change behavior and diet, have lacked impressive results. Although fluoride is the only well-documented agent which controls the rate at which cavities develop, it has been suggested that adding calcium to the water would reduce cavities further. Other agents to prevent tooth decay include antibacterials such as chlorhexidine and sugar substitutes such as xylitol. Xylitol-sweetened chewing gum has been recommended as a supplement to fluoride and other conventional treatments if the gum is not too costly. Two proposed approaches, bacteria replacement therapy (probiotics) and caries vaccine, would share water fluoridation's advantage of requiring only minimal patient compliance, but have not been proven safe and effective. Other experimental approaches include fluoridated sugar, polyphenols, and casein phosphopeptide–amorphous calcium phosphate nanocomplexes.

A 2007 Australian review concluded that water fluoridation is the most effective and socially the most equitable way to expose entire communities to fluoride's cavity-prevention effects. A 2002 U.S. review estimated that sealants decreased cavities by about 60% overall, compared to about 18–50% for fluoride. A 2007 Italian review suggested that water fluoridation may not be needed, particularly in the industrialized countries where cavities have become rare, and concluded that toothpaste and other topical fluoride are the best way to prevent cavities worldwide. A 2004 World Health Organization review stated that water fluoridation, when it is culturally acceptable and technically feasible, has substantial advantages in preventing tooth decay, especially for subgroups at high risk.

== Worldwide prevalence ==
Percentage of population receiving fluoridated water, including both artificial and natural fluoridation, as of 2012: 80–100% 60–80% 40–60% 20–40% 1–20% < 1% unknown

As of November 2012, a total of about 378 million people worldwide received artificially fluoridated water. The majority of those were in the United States. About 40 million worldwide received water that was naturally fluoridated to recommended levels.

Much of the early work on establishing the connection between fluoride and dental health was performed by scientists in the U.S. during the early 20th century, and the U.S. was the first country to implement public water fluoridation on a wide scale. It has been introduced to varying degrees in many countries and territories outside the U.S., including Argentina, Australia, Brazil, Canada, Chile, Colombia, Hong Kong, Ireland, Israel, Korea, Malaysia, New Zealand, the Philippines, Serbia, Singapore, Spain, the UK, and Vietnam. In 2004, an estimated 13.7 million people in western Europe and 194 million in the U.S. received artificially fluoridated water. In 2010, about 66% of the U.S. population was receiving fluoridated water.

Naturally fluoridated water is used by approximately 4% of the world's population, in countries including Argentina, France, Gabon, Libya, Mexico, Senegal, Sri Lanka, Tanzania, the U.S., and Zimbabwe. In some locations, notably parts of Africa, China, and India, natural fluoridation exceeds recommended levels.

Communities have discontinued water fluoridation in some countries, including Finland, Germany, Japan, the Netherlands, and Switzerland. Changes have been motivated by political opposition to water fluoridation, but sometimes the need for water fluoridation was met by alternative strategies. The use of fluoride in its various forms is the foundation of tooth decay prevention throughout Europe; several countries have introduced fluoridated salt, with varying success: in Switzerland and Germany, fluoridated salt represents 65% to 70% of the domestic market, while in France the market share reached 60% in 1993 but dwindled to 14% in 2009; Spain, in 1986 the second West European country to introduce fluoridation of table salt, reported a market share in 2006 of only 10%. In three other West European countries, Greece, Austria and the Netherlands, the legal framework for production and marketing of fluoridated edible salt exists. At least six Central European countries (Hungary, Czechia, Slovakia, Croatia, Slovenia, Romania) have shown some interest in salt fluoridation; however, significant usage of approximately 35% was only achieved in the Czech Republic. The Slovak Republic had the equipment to treat salt by 2005; in the other four countries attempts to introduce fluoridated salt were not successful. Additionally, concerns regarding potential overexposure to fluoride and the varying effectiveness of fluoridation methods have led some countries to reassess their approaches. Recent evaluations highlight a preference for topical fluoride applications, which are considered more effective and safer, especially given the limited systemic benefits of fluoridation beyond early childhood. When Israel implemented the 2014 Dental Health Promotion Program, that includes education, medical followup and the use of fluoride-containing products and supplements, it evaluated that mandatory water fluoridation was no longer necessary, stating "supply of fluoridated water forces those who do not so wish to also consume water with added fluoride. This approach is therefore not accepted in most countries in the world.".

== History ==
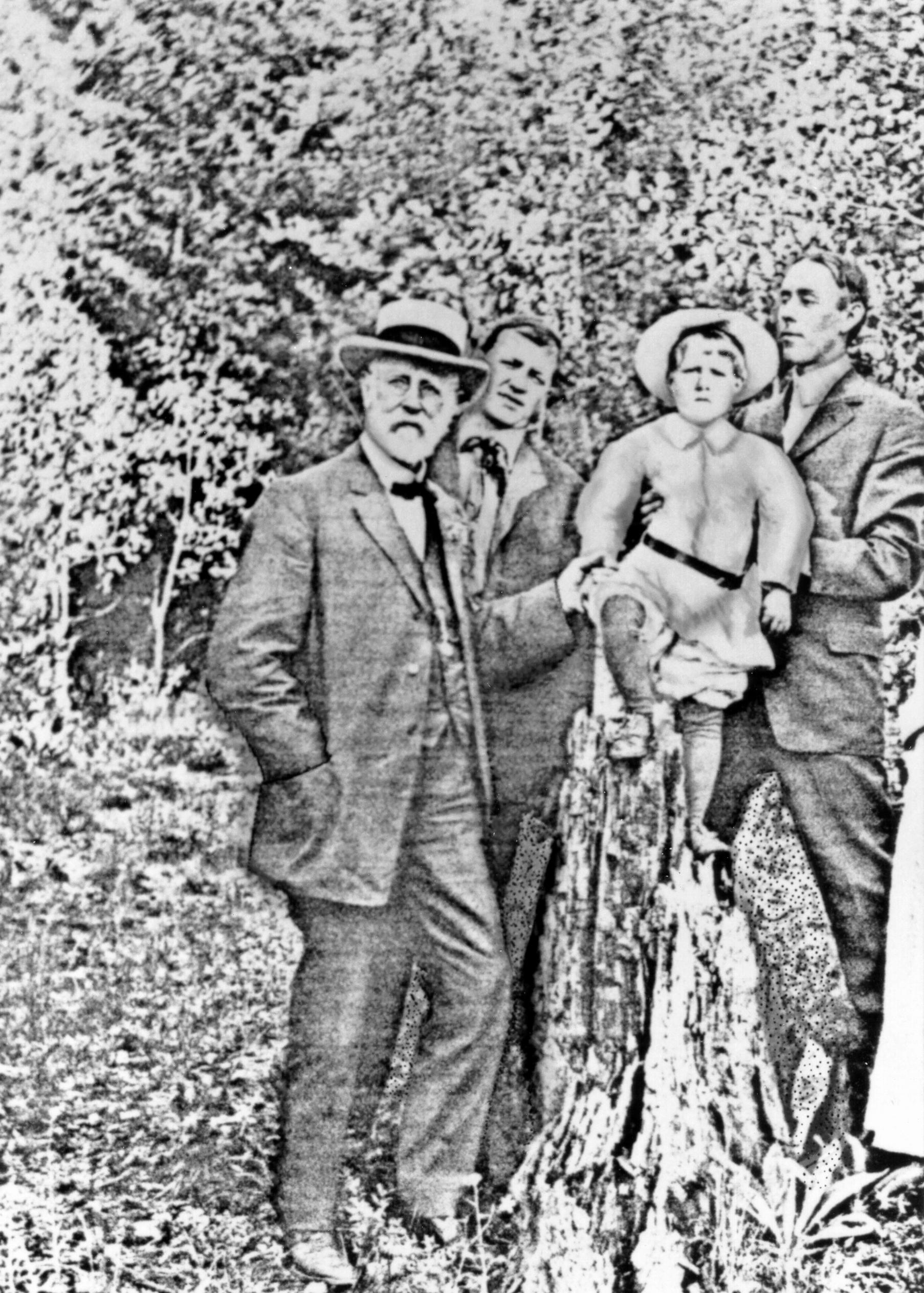
1909 photograph by Frederick McKay of G.V. Black (left), Isaac Burton and F.Y. Wilson, studying the Colorado brown stain

The history of water fluoridation can be divided into three periods. The first (c. 1801–1933) was research into the cause of a form of mottled tooth enamel called the Colorado brown stain. The second (c. 1933–1945) focused on the relationship between fluoride concentrations, fluorosis, and tooth decay, and established that moderate levels of fluoride prevent cavities. The third period, from 1945 on, focused on adding fluoride to community water supplies.

In the first half of the 19th century, investigators established that fluoride occurs with varying concentrations in teeth, bone, and drinking water. In the second half they speculated that fluoride would protect against tooth decay, proposed supplementing the diet with fluoride, and observed mottled enamel (now called severe dental fluorosis) without knowing the cause. In 1874, the German public health officer Carl Wilhelm Eugen Erhardt recommended potassium fluoride supplements to preserve teeth. In 1892, the British physician James Crichton-Browne suggested that the shift to refined flour, which reduced the consumption of grain husks and stems, led to fluorine's absence from diets and teeth that were "peculiarly liable to decay". He proposed "the reintroduction into our diet ... of fluorine in some suitable natural form ... to fortify the teeth of the next generation".

The foundation of water fluoridation in the U.S. was the research of the dentist Frederick McKay (1874–1959). McKay spent thirty years investigating the cause of what was then known as the Colorado brown stain, which produced mottled but also cavity-free teeth; with the help of G.V. Black and other researchers, he established that the cause was fluoride. The first report of a statistical association between the stain and lack of tooth decay was made by UK dentist Norman Ainsworth in 1925. In 1931, an Alcoa chemist, H.V. Churchill, concerned about a possible link between aluminum and staining, analyzed water from several areas where the staining was common and found that fluoride was the common factor.

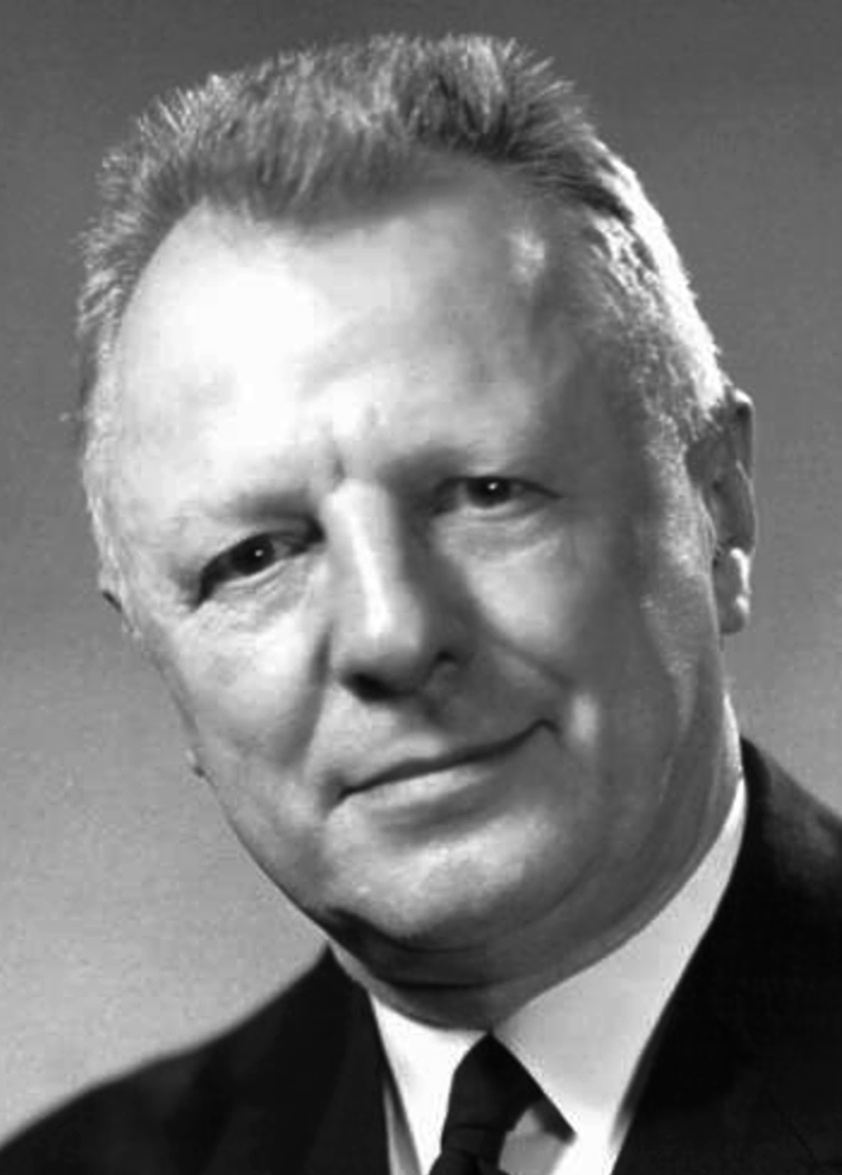
H. Trendley Dean set out in 1931 to study fluoride's harm, but by 1950 had demonstrated the cavity-prevention effects of small amounts.

In the 1930s and early 1940s, H. Trendley Dean and colleagues at the newly created U.S. National Institutes of Health published several epidemiological studies suggesting that a fluoride concentration of about 1 mg/L was associated with substantially fewer cavities in temperate climates, and that it increased fluorosis but only to a level that was of no medical or aesthetic concern. Other studies found no other significant adverse effects even in areas with fluoride levels as high as 8 mg/L. To test the hypothesis that adding fluoride would prevent cavities, Dean and his colleagues conducted a controlled experiment by fluoridating the water in Grand Rapids, Michigan, starting 25 January 1945. The results, published in 1950, showed significant reduction of cavities. Significant reductions in tooth decay were also reported by important early studies outside the U.S., including the Brantford–Sarnia–Stratford study in Canada (1945–1962), the Tiel–Culemborg study in the Netherlands (1953–1969), the Hastings study in New Zealand (1954–1970), and the Department of Health study in the U.K. (1955–1960). By present-day standards these and other pioneering studies were crude, but the large reductions in cavities convinced public health professionals of the benefits of fluoridation.

Fluoridation became an official policy of the U.S. Public Health Service by 1951, and by 1960 water fluoridation had become widely used in the U.S., reaching about 50 million people. By 2006, 69.2% of the U.S. population on public water systems were receiving fluoridated water, amounting to 61.5% of the total U.S. population; 3.0% of the population on public water systems were receiving naturally occurring fluoride. In some other countries the pattern was similar. New Zealand, which led the world in per-capita sugar consumption and had the world's worst teeth, began fluoridation in 1953, and by 1968 fluoridation was used by 65% of the population served by a piped water supply. Fluoridation was introduced into Brazil in 1953, was regulated by federal law starting in 1974, and by 2004 was used by 71% of the population. In the Republic of Ireland, fluoridation was legislated in 1960, and after a constitutional challenge the two major cities of Dublin and Cork began it in 1964; fluoridation became required for all sizeable public water systems and by 1996 reached 66% of the population. In other locations, fluoridation was used and then discontinued: in Kuopio, Finland, fluoridation was used for decades but was discontinued because the school dental service provided significant fluoride programs and the cavity risk was low, and in Basel, Switzerland, it was replaced with fluoridated salt.

McKay's work had established that fluorosis occurred before tooth eruption. Dean and his colleagues assumed that fluoride's protection against cavities was also pre-eruptive, and this incorrect assumption was accepted for years. By 2000, however, the topical effects of fluoride (in both water and toothpaste) were well understood, and it had become known that a constant low level of fluoride in the mouth works best to prevent cavities.

== Economics ==
Fluoridation costs an estimated $1.39 per person-year on the average (range: $0.33–$14.73; all costs in this paragraph are for the U.S. and are in 2025 dollars, inflation-adjusted from earlier estimates). Larger water systems have lower per capita cost, and the cost is also affected by the number of fluoride injection points in the water system, the type of feeder and monitoring equipment, the fluoride chemical and its transportation and storage, and water plant personnel expertise. In affluent countries the cost of salt fluoridation is also negligible; developing countries may find it prohibitively expensive to import the fluoride additive. By comparison, fluoride toothpaste costs an estimated $12–$23 per person-year, with the incremental cost being zero for people who already brush their teeth for other reasons; and dental cleaning and application of fluoride varnish or gel costs an estimated $128 per person-year. Assuming the worst case, with the lowest estimated effectiveness and highest estimated operating costs for small cities, fluoridation costs an estimated $21–$33 per saved tooth-decay surface, which is lower than the estimated $126 to restore the surface and the estimated $213 average discounted lifetime cost of the decayed surface, which includes the cost to maintain the restored tooth surface. It is not known how much is spent in industrial countries to treat dental fluorosis, which is mostly due to fluoride from swallowed toothpaste.

Although a 1989 workshop on cost-effectiveness of cavity prevention concluded that water fluoridation is one of the few public health measures that save more money than they cost, little high-quality research has been done on the cost-effectiveness and solid data are scarce. Dental sealants are cost-effective only when applied to high-risk children and teeth. A 2002 U.S. review estimated that on average, sealing first permanent molars saves costs when they are decaying faster than 0.47 surfaces per person-year whereas water fluoridation saves costs when total decay incidence exceeds 0.06 surfaces per person-year. In the U.S., water fluoridation is more cost-effective than other methods to reduce tooth decay in children, and a 2008 review concluded that water fluoridation is the best tool for combating cavities in many countries, particularly among socially disadvantaged groups. A 2016 review of studies published between 1995 and 2013 found that water fluoridation in the U.S. was cost-effective, and that it was more so in larger communities.

U.S. data from 1974 to 1992 indicate that when water fluoridation is introduced into a community, there are significant decreases in the number of employees per dental firm and the number of dental firms. The data suggest that some dentists respond to the demand shock by moving to non-fluoridated areas and by retraining as specialists.

== Controversy ==
The water fluoridation controversy arises from political, moral, ethical, economic, and safety concerns regarding the water fluoridation of public water supplies. For impoverished groups in both developing and developed countries, international and national agencies and dental associations across the world support the safety and effectiveness of water fluoridation. Authorities' views on the most effective fluoride therapy for community prevention of tooth decay are mixed; some state water fluoridation is most effective, while others see no special advantage and prefer topical application strategies.

Those opposed argue that water fluoridation has no or little cariostatic benefits, may cause serious health problems, is not effective enough to justify the costs, is pharmacologically obsolete, and presents a moral conflict between the common good and individual rights.

== See also ==
- Water fluoridation by country
- History of water supply and sanitation
