= Water fluoridation in Australia =

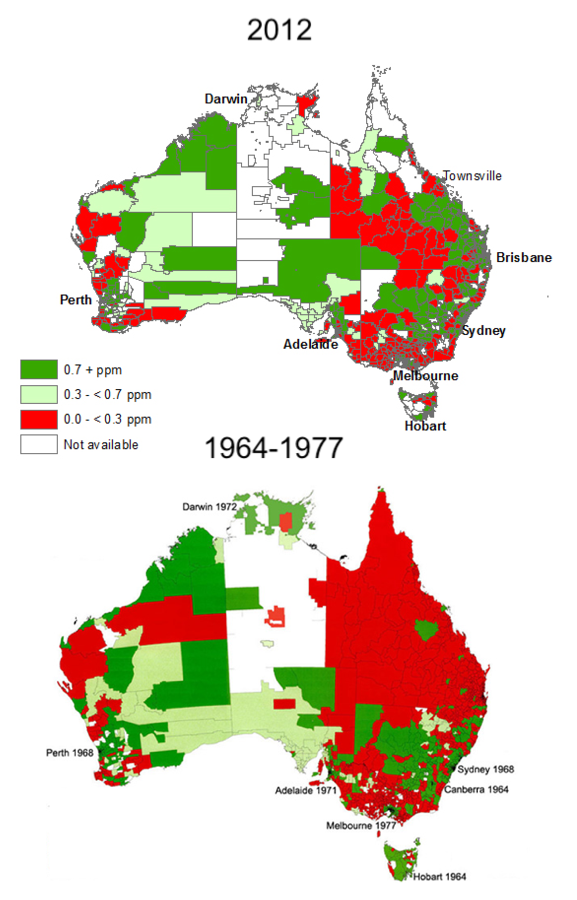
Amount of fluoride added to public water in ppm by postcode in Australia, 1964-1977 and 2012

Australia is one of many countries that have water fluoridation programs currently operating (see Water fluoridation by country). As of March 2012, artificially fluoridated drinking water is administered to 70% or more of the population in all states and territories. The acceptance of the benefits of water fluoridation occurred in Australia in December 1953, roughly two years after acceptance in the United States. Many of Australia's drinking water supplies subsequently began fluoridation in the 1960s and 1970s. By 1984 almost 66% of the Australian population had fluoridated drinking water, represented by 850 towns and cities. Some areas within Australia have natural fluoride levels in the groundwater, which was estimated in 1991 to provide drinking water to approximately 0.9% of the population.

A key difference between the implementation of drinking water fluoridation in the United States and Australia was the impact of temperature and climate on water consumption. Temperatures are a key factor in the establishment of legislative requirements, such as the Water Fluoridation Regulation 2020 in Queensland, that prescribes concentrations of fluoride to be added to the water. Consequently, areas with higher average temperatures require less fluoride to be added to the drinking water to achieve the same oral health benefits. The tropical conditions found in parts of Australia, such as Queensland, also make it difficult to maintain fluoridation equipment due to higher levels of corrosion caused by the wet climate.

The addition of fluoride to a drinking water supply is generally governed by the Australian Drinking Water Guidelines. The Guidelines recommend a health-related guideline value (maximum concentration) of 1.5 mg/L for fluoride, which mirrors the World Health Organization Guidelines for Drinking Water Quality 2006. Guidance on the concentration of fluoride has been present in the Guidelines since 1983.

The National Health and Medical Research Council of Australia (NHMRC) issued a Public Statement in 2017 on Water Fluoridation and Human Health in Australia. The statement says “There is reliable evidence that community water fluoridation helps to prevent tooth decay. The consequences of tooth decay are considerable: dental pain, concern about appearance, costs due to time off school and work, and costs of dental treatment. There is no reliable evidence of an association between community water fluoridation at current Australian levels and any health problems.”

== Australian Capital Territory ==
Fluoride was initially recommended to be added to the Canberra water supply in December 1961 by the ACT Advisory Council, however the recommendation was not accepted. The ACT Advisory Body continued to lobby the government and fluoridation of the water supplies in Canberra and the City of Queanbeyan commenced in May 1964. Queanbeyan, while in New South Wales shares its water supply with Canberra. There was a brief period in 1989 where fluoridation was suspended following a formal review of the effectiveness of fluoridation on oral health. As only one water supplier provides all of the water for these areas, the percentage of the population with fluoridated water has always been 100% during the times in which it was added.

== New South Wales ==
The use of fluoride in New South Wales (NSW) is regulated by the Fluoridation of Public Water Supplies Act 1957, and the Fluoridation of Public Water Supplies Regulation 2022. The legislation constitutes the Fluoridation of Public Water Supplies Advisory Committee and prescribes its membership under section 4 of the Act. As of April 2025, it is currently chaired by the NSW Chief Dentist who was nominated by the Minister for Health, along with five other members representing health and local government agencies. Under the Act and regulations the local area council must make a request to the NSW Health Department that their water supplies be fluoridated. However, subsequent to that, if a council wishes to discontinue fluoridation then that decision rests with the Secretary of the Department of Health (Section 6B Discontinuance of Fluoridation).

Approximately 93% of the NSW population has fluoridated water as of February 2017. Fluoridation commenced in New South Wales with Yass in 1956. Sydney began fluoridation in 1968. One of the earliest locations to receive fluoridation was Grafton in 1964. However, the night before fluoridation was to commence the equipment was blown up. The equipment was reinstalled and Grafton has fluoridated water.

Fluoridation has not been implemented by some council areas and water utilities that service multiple council areas. They include: Hilltops Council, Brewarrina Shire, Byron Shire, Carrathool Shire, Central Darling Shire, Coonamble Shire, Gunnedah Shire, Gwydir Shire, Liverpool Plains Shire, Murrumbidgee Council, Narrabri Shire, Narrandera Shire, Narromine Shire, Upper Hunter Shire, Murray River Council, Walgett Shire and Wentworth Shire. Narrabri Shire, Narrandera Shire, Narromine Shire have naturally occurring levels of fluoride and do not supplement their water supplies. In 2018, Bega Valley Shire council voted 6 to 2 to add fluoride the areas that were not fluoridated. Oberon Council voted 5 to 3 to add fluoride to the local water supply in July 2018 and the instrument of approval was issued in October 2018. Liverpool Plains Shire council has been considering fluoridation of its water supply since 2018.

In November 2013, Byron Shire Council decided to not add fluoride to its water supply.

== Northern Territory ==
The addition of Fluoride to public water supplies in the Northern Territory (NT) is regulated via government policies. In 2010 the NT Department of Health published a position paper that strongly encourages water providers to add fluoride where possible but it is not mandated. The Department of Health believes that communities with greater than 600 persons and naturally occurring fluoride of less than 0.5 mg/L should receive fluoridation based on a cost benefit analysis. The fluoridation of NT water supplies is the responsibility of PowerWater that supplies water to 92 locations, seven have fluoride added to their water and 71 have sufficient natural fluoride levels.

As of 2012, 70% of the population in the Northern Territory has fluoridated water. Approximately 9% of the population have naturally fluoridated water. Fluoride has been added to public water supplies in Darwin since 1972. Katherine, Angurugu, Maningrida, Umbakumba, Wadeye and Wurrumiyanga (Nguiu) also have fluoridated water. As of 2019 fourteen other areas are being considered for fluoridation. Nhulunbuy, in north east Arnhem Land does not fluoridate and a review carried out in 2020 has not resolved the issue. In 2019 the East Arnhem Clinical & Public Health Advisory Group sent an open letter to the PowerWater supporting water fluoridation.

Supplies south of Elliott have naturally occurring fluoride at levels sufficient to provide an oral health benefit. Most communities in the Barkly and Southern regions have fluoride levels between 0.5 mg/L and 1.5 mg/L. In 2017-18 three locations recorded above accepted maximum levels at Alpurrurulam (1.7 mg/L), Nyirripi (1.8 mg/L) and Yuelamu (1.6 mg/L). Concern has been raised about fluoride levels below acceptable levels in Alice Springs and Yulara.

== Queensland ==
Queensland residents served with community water fluoridation, 2011

In Queensland (QLD), prior to the Fluoridation of Public Water Supplies Act 1963, some councils had fluoridated town water supplied under the Local Government Acts. These Acts used general competency clauses that gave councils the ability to use discretionary powers if the action was not specifically covered by legislation. Under this Fluoridation of Public Water Supplies Act 1963 (Qld) only 5% of drinking water supplies were fluoridated. Queensland was unique in that it did not pursue water fluoridation like all the other Australian States and Territories and only 7 of the 850 Australian fluoridated water supplies operating in 1984 were located in Queensland. The reason for the low uptake of fluoridation in Queensland "lies with the Fluoridation of Public Water Supplies Act 1963 (Qld), which gives real power to the minister for Local Government, local authorities and 10 percent of electors, who can all request a referendum on fluoridation proposals. This law has given opponents of fluoridation tactical advantages, which they have used consistently."

Under Queensland Premier Anna Bligh, the Labor government announced on 5 December 2007 that the mandatory fluoridation of most of Queensland's water supplies will begin in 2008. The 2008 Act received bipartisan support on its second reading. The fluoridation of drinking water supplies is regulated by Queensland Health. Prior to this legislation Queensland was the only Australian state without a formal statewide program for the addition of fluoride to drinking water; unlike other states responsibility for fluoridation lies with the Minister for Local Government rather than the Minister for Health.

On 29 November 2012 the Queensland Parliament, with a Liberal National Party government, reversed the previous Labor government's mandate requiring certain public potable water supplies to add fluoride to the water. Annastacia Palaszczuk criticised the decision of the government at that time but later stated in 2016 that "there is no present intention of reversing the 2012 decision." This decision is seen as a regional political issue taking precedence over the government's positive stance on fluoridation. As a consequence of these changes local councils in Queensland have the choice to add fluoride to drinking water supplies, similar to the conditions in place under the previous legislation.

Five local council areas have naturally occurring fluoride in their water supplies: Bulloo Shire, Diamantina Shire, Kowanyama Aboriginal Shire, McKinlay Shire and Quilpie Shire. Both Birdsville in the Dimantina Shire and Julia Creek in the McKinlay Shire have naturally occurring fluoride level that exceed safe levels. Several areas of Queensland, generally in areas above the Great Artesian Basin, are known to have naturally occurring fluoride present in their drinking water, a characteristic that has been studied since the late 1920s.

In summary, of the 77 local councils in Queensland, five have naturally high levels of fluoride, 26 fluoridate some or all of their water and the remainder do not fluoridate their water. In South East Queensland water is supplied to a number of council areas by Seqwater who continue to fluoridate their water. Since November 2012 the major regional centres of Cairns, Mackay, Rockhamption, Gladstone and numerous other councils have stopped fluoridation of their water.

After Mackay Shire Council decided to cease fluoridation of their water supply, Mayor Greg Williamson stated "... as a local council, public health is not our domain. We shouldn't be in this situation, but we are, so we made a decision." While Councilor Manning from the Cairns Shire Council stated "It is also clear that fluoride is a State issue and if you believe that children in this state have poorer oral health than others, surely it's time for Queensland Health to take responsibility for this issue as it does for other public health matters."

== South Australia ==
Water fluoridation in South Australia (SA) is administered through government policy rather than legislation. It is the responsibility of SA Water to administer fluoridation with South Australian water Supplies. In many cases water derived from bores is not fluoridated.

Water fluoridation commenced in Adelaide in 1971. There is no legal requirement to add fluoride to drinking water supplies. As of March 2020, SA Health states that "90% of the state’s communities have access to reticulated water with appropriate levels of fluoride".

== Tasmania ==
Fluoridation in Tasmania was initially regulated under the Public Health Act of 1953. The Tasmanian Government set up a Royal Commission to look into Fluoridation in 1966 and the report was published in 1968. The Royal Commission recommended that fluoridation should be a state responsibility. The Royal Commission stated that "Fluoridation must be a decision of the State Government. It is not a decision for a referendum or for local councils as people simply do not have the expertise in that. For a State Government to refer this decision off to a referendum or to local government would be an abrogation of the State's responsibility."

The Fluoridation Act 1968 was passed and gained royal assent in January 1969, this act regulates the fluoridation of drinking water in Tasmania. Almost all (98%) all public water supplies in Tasmania are fluoridated although approximately 10% of the residents do not have access to public water supplies. Under the Act, the need to add fluoride to a water supply is assessed by a fluoridation committee, which then provides a recommendation to the Health Minister. The Health Minister may then choose to direct the water authority to add fluoride to the water.

The first town in Australia to fluoridate its water supply was Beaconsfield, Tasmania in 1953. It is understood that the impetus to fluoridate the water came from the Municipal chemist, Frank Grey, who was prompted to act when an opera singer advised him not to let his daughter's teeth be pulled if he wished her to continue singing. This was after a visiting dentist (to the local school) had extracted a tooth from his daughter.

== Victoria ==
Fluoride was first added to the drinking water for the Victorian town of Bacchus Marsh in 1962, with Melbourne beginning fluoridation in 1977. The towns of Portland and Port Fairy have naturally occurring fluoride in their drinking water. As of October 2024, approximately 90% of the Victorian population had fluoridated water. The fluoridation of Victoria's drinking water supplies is regulated by the Health (Fluoridation) Act 1973.

While 90% of Victorians have fluoridated drinking water, there are still many rural towns in Victoria that do not, including in some outer suburbs of the city of Mildura.

== Western Australia ==
Water fluoridation in Western Australia (WA) is regulated by the Fluoridation of Public Water Supplies Act 1966. The Act is administered by the Western Australian Department of Health through the Fluoridation of Public Water Supplies Advisory Committee. The minister for Health can only direct water be fluoridated on the advice of the committee.

Water fluoridation was introduced in Western Australia 1968. As of 2016, around 92% of the population is administered fluoridated water through a drinking water supply. Western Australia has a number of areas where no additional fluoride is added to reach effective levels; these include: Halls Creek, Marble Bar, Onslow, Paraburdoo, Tom Price, Meekatharra, Carnarvon, Bremer Bay, Leonora and Laverton.

The water supply in Dunsborough, in the south west of Western Australia, is de-fluoridated to the optimal level (0.6 to 0.9 milligram per litre). Dunsborough gets its water from two aquifers and only the Sue Aquifer has fluoride above the optimum level.
