= Water fluoridation by country =

Percentage of population receiving fluoridated water, including both artificial and natural fluoridation, as of 2012: 80–100% 60–80% 40–60% 20–40% 1–20% < 1% unknown

Water fluoridation is the controlled addition of fluoride to a public water supply to reduce tooth decay, and is handled differently by countries across the world.

Water fluoridation is considered very common in the United States, Canada, Ireland, Chile and Australia where over 50% of the population drinks fluoridated water.

Most European countries including Italy, France, Finland, Germany, Sweden, Netherlands, Scotland, Austria, Poland, Hungary and Switzerland do not fluoridate water, but use fluoridated salt, milk, and toothpastes to reduce cavities.

Fluoridated water contains fluoride at a level that is proven effective for preventing cavities; this can occur naturally or by adding fluoride. Fluoridated water creates low levels of fluoride in saliva, which reduces the rate at which tooth enamel demineralizes, and increases the rate at which it remineralizes in the early stages of cavities. Typically, a fluoridated compound is added to drinking water, a process that in the U.S. costs an average of about $1.39 per person-year. Defluoridation is needed when the naturally occurring fluoride level exceeds recommended limits. In 2011, the World Health Organization suggested a level of fluoride from 0.5 to 1.5 mg/L (milligrams per liter), depending on climate, local environment, and other sources of fluoride. Bottled water typically has unknown fluoride levels.

== Health effects ==
Dental cavities remain a major public health concern in most industrialized countries, affecting 60–90% of schoolchildren and the vast majority of adults. Water fluoridation may slightly reduce cavities in children, while efficacy in adults is less clear. Recent studies suggest that water fluoridation, particularly in industrialized countries, may be unnecessary because topical fluorides (such as in toothpaste) are widely used and cavity rates have become low. For this reason, some scientists consider fluoridation to be unethical due to the lack of informed consent. However, a recent study funded by NHS found no significant difference between individuals who receive fluoridated water and those who don't in terms of missing teeth and reducing social inequities.

Although fluoridation can cause dental fluorosis, which can alter the appearance of developing teeth or enamel fluorosis, the differences are mild and usually not considered to be of aesthetic or public-health concern. There is no clear evidence of other adverse effects from water fluoridation, as revealed by the York review from 2000. A 2007 Australian systematic review used the same inclusion criteria as York's, plus one additional study. This did not affect the York conclusions. Fluoride's effects depend on the total daily intake of fluoride from all sources. Drinking water is typically the largest source; other methods of fluoride therapy include fluoridation of toothpaste, salt, and milk. The views on the most effective method for community prevention of tooth decay are mixed. The Australian government states that water fluoridation is the most effective means of achieving fluoride exposure that is community-wide. The World Health Organization states water fluoridation, when feasible and culturally acceptable, has substantial advantages, especially for subgroups at high risk, while the European Commission finds no advantage to water fluoridation compared with topical use.

Currently about 372 million people (around 5.7% of the world population) receive artificially fluoridated water in about 24 countries, including Australia, Brazil, Canada, Chile, Republic of Ireland, Malaysia, the U.S., and Vietnam. 57.4 million people receive naturally occurring fluoridated water at or above optimal levels in countries such as Sweden, China, Sri Lanka, Finland, Zimbabwe and Gabon. Community water fluoridation is rare in Continental Europe, with 97–98% choosing not to fluoridate drinking water. Fluoridated salt and milk is promoted in some European countries instead. Water fluoridation has been replaced by other modes in many countries where water supplies are too decentralized for it to be a practical choice, or existing natural fluoride levels were already ample, including Germany, Finland, Japan, Netherlands, Sweden, Switzerland (Switzerland has 1 mg fluoride per 1 liter, USA only between 0.3 mg and 0.7 mg) water Denmark and at a time Israel. Cessation of water fluoridation has been demonstrated in scientific studies such as a recent one in Calgary, Alberta, to result in increased rates of dental decay. While fluoridation can result in mild dental fluorosis, this effect is barely detectable and causes no concerns with the appearance or health of teeth. Countries practicing artificial water fluoridation vary in their recommended fluoride levels according to what health authorities in each have determined to be most effective for its citizens. The US recently reset the recommended optimal level of fluoride in drinking water, lowering it slightly, because of observed increased fluorosis levels, likely due to additional fluoride sources like toothpaste and mouthwash which were not present when this level was originally set.

== Africa ==
=== Libya ===
Before 2003, 400,000 Libyans were receiving artificially fluoridated water.

=== Nigeria ===
Only a fraction of Nigerians receive water from waterworks, so water fluoridation affects very few people. A 2009 study found that about 21% of water sources naturally contain fluoride to the recommended range of 0.3–0.6 ppm. About 62% have fluoride below this range.

=== South Africa ===
South Africa's Health Department recommends adding fluoridation chemicals to drinking water in some areas. It also advises removal of fluoride from drinking water (defluoridation) where the fluoride content is too high.

Legislation around mandatory fluoridation was introduced in 2002, but has been delayed since then pending further research after opposition from water companies, municipalities and the public.

=== Zambia ===
Approximately 947,000 (7% of the population) receives water with naturally occurring fluoride in it.

=== Zimbabwe ===
Roughly 2,600,000 (21% of the population) receives water with naturally occurring fluoride in it.

== Asia ==
=== China ===
Many areas in China have fluoride at levels far higher than recommended due to natural occurrence or industrial contamination, which has resulted in a large amount of skeletal fluorosis. Water fluoridation levels are set at a national standard of 1 mg/L, with higher levels for rural areas at 1.2 mg/L. Water fluoridation began in 1965 in the urban area of Guangzhou. It was interrupted during 1976–1978 due to the shortage of sodium silico-fluoride. It was resumed only in the Fangcun district of the city, but was halted in 1983 after opponents claimed that fluoride levels were already sufficiently high in local foods and tea. Later analysis in 1988 found that the incidence of dental caries among 4-year-old children had increased by 62%. The fluoridation reduced the number of cavities, but increased dental fluorosis; the fluoride levels could have been set too high, and low-quality equipment led to inconsistent, and often excessive, fluoride concentrations.

=== Hong Kong ===
All Hong Kong residents receive natural occurring fluoride in water, at about half the traditionally recommended fluoride level. The Water Supplies Department fluoridates rainwater from 17 local reservoirs, in 21 treatment plants. Recent tests showed drinking water to have an average fluoride level of 0.48 mg/L, and a maximum of 0.69 mg/L.

=== India ===
Water fluoridation is not practiced in India. Due to naturally occurring fluoride, both skeletal and dental fluorosis have been endemic in India in at least 20 states, including Uttarakhand, Jharkhand and Chhattisgarh. The maximum permissible limit of fluoride in drinking water in India is 1.2 mg/L, and the government has been obligated to install fluoride removal plants of various technologies to reduce fluoride levels from industrial waste and mineral deposits. Now reverse osmosis plants are widely used. Household and public system reverse osmosis plants are common in the market. Alleppey in Kerala is most affected with over-fluoridated water. Government-installed reverse osmosis plants supply free filtered water. Rotary International Club, Saratoga USA, helped to install 3 RO Plants in rural Alleppey.

As of 2014, there are 14,132 habitations in 19 States still containing fluoride above the permissible levels in drinking water. Rajasthan has the highest number of habitations (7,670) with high amount of fluoride in drinking water. Telangana has 1174, Karnataka has 1122 and Madhya Pradesh has 1055 habitation. Assam, Andhra Pradesh, Bihar, Chhattisgarh, Maharashtra, Odisha, West Bengal and Uttar Pradesh also has such habitations.

The government of India launched the National Programme for Prevention and Control of Fluorosis in 2008–2009. In 2013–2014, the programme was brought under the National Rural Health Mission, which has so far covered 111 districts. The programme includes surveillance of fluorosis in the community, training and manpower support, establishment of diagnostic facilities, treatment and health education. The Indian Council of Medical Research has formed a task force on fluorosis to address issues related to prevention and control.

=== Israel ===
Fluoride was required in water supplies nationwide by legislation passed in 2002, but the requirement was repealed in 2014, and artificial fluoridation was disparaged by national health officials, effectively ending the practice in Israel for a short while. After the election of 2015 the fluoridation program was to be re-debated the new deputy Health Minister Yaakov Litzman.

Mekorot, Israel's national water company states, "In the South of the country, it is unnecessary to add fluoride because it is found naturally in the water." Water fluoridation was introduced in Israel's large cities in 1981, and a national effort to fluoridate all the country's water was approved in 1988.

In 2002, the Union of Local Authorities (ULA) and others petitioned Israel's High Court to stop the Health Ministry from forcing cities to implement water fluoridation. The court soon issued a restraining order, but after half a year ULA withdrew its petition upon the request of the court.

By 2011, about 65% of the municipalities and local authorities in Israel had agreed to allow fluoridation, and there was active opposition to the spread of fluoridation to the towns where it has not yet been instituted. In 2011, the Health and Welfare Committee of the Knesset criticized the Health Ministry for continuation of water fluoridation.

On 26 August 2014, Israel officially stopped adding fluoride to its water supplies. According to a Ministry of Health press release statement, the reasons it ended water fluoridation were: "Only some 1% of the water is used for drinking, while 99% of the water is intended for other uses (industry, agriculture, flushing toilets etc.). There is also scientific evidence that fluoride in large amounts can lead to damage to health. When fluoride is supplied via drinking water, there is no control regarding the amount of fluoride actually consumed, which could lead to excessive consumption. Supply of fluoridated water forces those who do not so wish to also consume water with added fluoride." Many in the medical and dental communities in Israel criticized the decision as a mistake.

After the election of 2015, the new deputy Health Minister Yaakov Litzman announced that the fluoridation program will be re-debated.

In 2022, the Israel Journal of Health Policy Research released a study titled The effect of community water fluoridation cessation on children's dental health: a national experience which concluded that lack of fluoride in the water caused a surge in tooth decay, especially in children. The paper stated, "our results clearly show the benefits of CWF in maintaining pediatric dental health. It seems that CWF was stopped for political reasons, and the lack of fluoride has led to an increase in dental problems which can cause systemic health issues."

As of July 2024, although in practice there is no legal impediment today to the return of drinking water fluoridation, it has not yet been returned in practice, and there has been no drinking water fluoridation in Israel.

=== Japan ===
The first community water fluoridation programme was in Kyoto prefecture in 1952, lasting 13 years. The second was established by US military authorities in Okinawa prefecture in 1957, lasting 15 years. The last experience was in Mie Prefecture in 1967, lasting 4 years.

Less than 1% of Japan practices water fluoridation. Instead, as of March 2010, a total of 7,479 schools and 777,596 preschool to junior high school children were participating in school-based fluoride mouth-rinsing programme (S-FMR), with an estimate of 2,000,000 children participating in 2020.

=== South Korea ===
In 2005, the ruling Uri Party proposed legislation for compulsory water fluoridation for municipalities. The legislation failed, and only 29 out of around 250 municipal governments had introduced water fluoridation at that time. Fluoridation was proposed again in 2012.

=== Malaysia ===
In 1998, 66% of Malaysians were getting fluoridated water.

In 2010, Bernama reported, "Principal Director (Oral Health) in the Health Ministry, Datuk Dr Norain Abu Taib said that only 75.5% of the country's population are enjoying the benefits of water fluoridation".

=== Singapore ===
In 1956, Singapore was the first Asian country to institute a water fluoridation program that covered 100% of the population. Water is fluoridated to a typical value of 0.4-0.6 mg per litre.

=== Taiwan ===
Taiwan does not currently fluoridate its water.

=== Vietnam ===
Only about 4% of the population of Vietnam has water fluoridation, whereas only 70% get their water from public supplies. Many places in Vietnam already have sufficient levels of fluoride or in some cases, fluoride concentrations were already too high and needed to be reduced to avoid the effects of fluorosis.

== Europe ==
Out of a population of about three-quarters of a billion, under 14 million people (approximately 2%) in Europe receive artificially fluoridated water. Those people are in the UK (5,797,000), Republic of Ireland (4,780,000), Spain (4,250,000), and Serbia (300,000).

The first water fluoridation in Europe was in West Germany and Sweden in 1952, bringing fluoridated water to about 42,000 people. By mid-1962, about 1 million Europeans in 18 communities in 11 countries were receiving fluoridated water.

Many European countries have rejected water fluoridation, including: Austria, Belgium, Finland, France, Germany, Hungary, Luxembourg, Netherlands, Northern Ireland, Norway, Sweden, Switzerland, Scotland, Iceland, and Italy. A 2003 survey of over 500 Europeans from 16 countries concluded that "the vast majority of people opposed water fluoridation".

=== Armenia ===
Drinking water (tap water, spring water, river water) was tested in every region in Armenia, and as of 2024 the fluoride content in Armenia ranges from 0.099 mg/L to 0.407 mg/L depending on the province, which are levels below the WHO maximum guideline of 1.5 mg/L.

=== Austria ===
Austria has never implemented fluoridation due to an adequate level of fluoride in drinking water according to a study conducted in 1993. (Nell A, Sperr W. Fluoridgehaltuntersuchung des Trinkwassers in Osterreich 1993 [Analysis of the fluoride content of drinking water in Austria 1993]. Wien Klin Wochenschr. 1994;106(19):608-14. German. PMID 7998407.)

=== Belgium ===
Belgium does not fluoridate its water supply, although legislation permits it.

=== Czech Republic ===
Czech Republic (previously Czechoslovakia) started water fluoridation in 1958 in Tábor. In Prague fluoridation started in 1975. It was stopped in Prague in 1988 and subsequently in the whole country. Since 2008 no water has been fluoridated. Fluoridated salt is available.

=== Croatia ===
Croatia does not fluoridate their tap water.

=== Denmark ===
Denmark has released test results for levels of various water contaminants, including fluoride, in the drinking water of some cities: Copenhagen, Brøndby, Albertslund, Dragør, Hvidovre, Rødovre, Vallensbæk, and Herlev.

=== Estonia ===
There is no water fluoridation in Estonia. About 5% of the population may be exposed to excessive natural fluoride in drinking waters, and there are measures to remove excess fluoride. About 4% of Estonians drink high-fluoride drinking water and are exposed to toxic effects of fluoride.

=== Finland ===
Kuopio is the only community in Finland with at least 70,000 people that has ever had water fluoridated. Kuopio stopped fluoridation in 1992. In regions with rapakivi bedrock (small, but densely populated regions), 22% of well waters and 55% of drilled well waters exceed the legal limit of 1.5 mg/L; generally, surface and well waters have 0.5-2.0 mg/L fluoride in affected regions.

=== France ===
Fluoridated salt is available in France, and 3% of the population uses naturally fluoridated water, but the water is not artificially fluoridated.

=== Georgia ===
Water fluoridation in the capital of Tbilisi ranges from 0.08 to 0.22 mg/L.

=== Germany ===
Public drinking water supplies are not currently fluoridated in any part of Germany, however for children and adolescents use of fluoridated salt and toothpaste, as well as fluoride tablets and washes is strongly encouraged by the German Ministry of Health.

Kassel-Wahlershausen in West Germany became the second location in Europe where water fluoridation was practiced in 1952. By 1962, no other part of the FRG was fluoridating, and Kassel-Wahlershausen discontinued the practice in 1971.

In the GDR (East Germany) in the late 1980s, about 3.4 million people (20%) were receiving water with added fluoride. Fluoride tablets were also provided. The fluoridated areas of the GDR included the towns of Karl-Marx-Stadt (now Chemnitz), Plauen, Zittau, and Spremberg. Children in those towns were part of large long-running studies of caries prevalence. A fluoride cessation study found that consistent with a previously observed population-wide phenomenon that the rate of cavities continued to drop after the fluoride concentration in water fell from the augmented 1.0 ppm to its natural level below 0.2 ppm. Water fluoridation was discontinued after the German reunification although still exists on some US military bases.

=== Greece ===
There is no water fluoridation in Greece.

=== Hungary ===
In the early 1960s the city of Szolnok briefly fluoridated its water. The program was discontinued due to technical problems and a public view that fluoridation did not seem reasonable. Hungary has not used artificially fluoridated water since then.

=== Ireland ===
Ireland is the only European country with a policy of mandatory water fluoridation. Worldwide, Ireland, Singapore and New Zealand are the only countries which implement mandatory water fluoridation.

The majority of drinking water in the Republic, (but not Northern Ireland), is fluoridated. In 2012, roughly 3.25 million people received artificially fluoridated water. Almost 71% of the population in 2002 resided in fluoridated communities. All public water supplies are fluoridated and the remainder of the supplies are group water schemes which are privately owned and not fluoridated artificially. The fluoridation agent used is hydrofluorosilicic acid (HFSA; H_{2}SiF_{6}). In a 2002 public survey, 45% of respondents expressed some concern about fluoridation.

In 1957, the Department of Health established a Fluorine Consultative Council which recommended fluoridation at 1.0 ppm of public water supplies, then accessed by approximately 50% of the population. This was felt to be an effective way of preventing tooth decay, in an era before fluoridated toothpaste was commonly used. This led to the Health (Fluoridation of Water Supplies) Act 1960, which mandated compulsory fluoridation by local authorities. The statutory instruments made in 1962–65 under the 1960 Act were separate for each local authority, setting the level of fluoride in drinking water to 0.8–1.0 ppm. The current regulations date from 2007, and set the level to 0.6–0.8 ppm, with a target value of 0.7 ppm.

Implementation of fluoridation was held up by preliminary dental surveying and water testing, and a court case, Ryan v. Attorney General.

In 1960, the Fianna Fáil minister for health, Seán MacEntee, brought forward the Health (Fluoridation of Water Supplies) Act and a Dublin housewife Gladys Ryan challenged the Act as an "invasion of family rights". Ryan lost the case, which lasted 65 days, at the High Court (Ireland), and appealed to the Supreme Court. Ryan was represented in court by Seán MacBride who argued that fluoridation was an infringement of human rights since people had no option but to drink it. Ryan's lawyers, including Richie Ryan (politician) worked on a pro bono basis and expenses were paid by fundraising. In 1965, the Supreme Court rejected Gladys Ryan's appeal that the Act violated the Constitution of Ireland's guarantee of the right to bodily integrity.

By 1965, Greater Dublin's water was fluoridated; by 1973, other urban centers were too. Studies from the late 1970s to mid 1990s showed a decrease in (and lower incidence of) dental decay in school children living in areas where water was fluoridated than in areas where water was not fluoridated. The government of the Republic of Ireland has yet to carry out a public health survey on the effects of fluoridation, even though this is required to under the 1960 Health (Fluoridation of Water Supplies) Act.

A private member's bill to end fluoridation was defeated in the Dáil on 12 November 2013. It was supported by Sinn Féin and some of the technical group and opposed by the Fine Gael-Labour government and Fianna Fáil.

There is much local government opposition to compulsory fluoridation, legally mandated nationwide by Dáil Éireann. Early in 2014, Cork County Council and Laois County Council passed motions for the cessation of water fluoridation. In Autumn 2014, Cork City Council, Dublin City Council and Kerry County Council passed similar motions. However, because of the 1960 law forcing artificial fluoridation of the public water, city councils and corporations can only vote to stop fluoridation but have no power to stop it, unless the law is repealed.

Fine Gael was opposed to compulsory water fluoridation but they now support the policy. Fianna Fáil is in favour of compulsory water fluoridation and in 2004 Micheál Martin set up the pro-fluoride Irish Expert Body on Fluorides and Health.

=== Italy ===
There is no water or food fluoridation in Italy. Except for isolated locations near volcanos or polluters, fluoride in water is low across the country.

=== Latvia ===
There is no water fluoridation in Latvia. Riga's upper limit on natural fluoride is 1.5 mg/L.

=== Netherlands ===
Water was fluoridated in large parts of the Netherlands from 1960 to 1973, when the High Council of The Netherlands declared fluoridation of drinking water unauthorized. Dutch authorities had no legal basis for adding chemicals to drinking water if they would not contribute to a sound water supply. Drinking water has not been fluoridated in any part of the Netherlands since 1973.

=== Norway ===
In 2000, representatives of the Norwegian National Institute for Public Health reported that no cities in Norway were practicing water fluoridation. There had been intense discussion of the issue around 1980, but no ongoing political discussion in 2000. In recent years, Norway has continued its policy against water fluoridation. The Norwegian Directorate of Health has stated that there is no need for water fluoridation due to the low prevalence of dental caries and the availability of fluoride through other means, such as toothpaste and professional dental treatments. Public debate in Norway remains focused on promoting overall dental hygiene rather than introducing fluoridation of public water supplies.

=== Serbia ===
About 300,000 people in Serbia (3%) were receiving fluoridated water before 2003.

=== Spain ===
Around 10% of the population (4,250,000 people) receive fluoridated water.

=== Sweden ===
In 1952, Norrköping in Sweden became one of the first cities in Europe to fluoridate its water supply. It was declared illegal by the Supreme Administrative Court of Sweden in 1961, re-legalized in 1962 and finally prohibited by the parliament in 1971, after considerable debate. The parliament majority said that there were other and better ways of reducing tooth decay than water fluoridation. Four cities received permission to fluoridate tap water when it was legal. An official commission was formed, which published its final report in 1981. They recommended other ways of reducing tooth decay (improving food and oral hygiene habits) instead of fluoridating tap water. They also found that many people found fluoridation to infringe upon personal liberty/freedom of choice by forcing them to be medicated, and that the long-term effects of fluoridation were insufficiently acknowledged. They also lacked a proper study on the effects of fluoridation on formula-fed infants.

=== Switzerland ===
In Switzerland, since 1962, two fluoridation programs had operated in tandem: water fluoridation in the City of Basel, and salt fluoridation in the rest of Switzerland (around 83% of domestic salt sold had fluoride added). However it became increasingly difficult to keep the two programs separate. As a result, some of the population of Basel were assumed to use both fluoridated salt and fluoridated water. In order to correct the situation, in April 2003 the Grand Council of Basel-Stadt resolved to cease water fluoridation and expand salt fluoridation to Basel.

=== United Kingdom ===
Around 14% of the population of the United Kingdom receives fluoridated water. About half a million people receive water that is naturally fluoridated with calcium fluoride, and about 6 million total receive fluoridated water. The Water Act 2003 required water suppliers to comply with requests from local health authorities to fluoridate their water.

The following UK water utility companies fluoridate their supply:

- Anglian Water Services Ltd
- Northumbrian Water Ltd
- South Staffordshire Water plc
- Severn Trent plc
- United Utilities Water plc

Earlier plans were undertaken in the Health Authority areas of Bedfordshire, Hertfordshire, Birmingham, Black Country, Cheshire, Merseyside, County Durham, Tees Valley, Cumbria, Lancashire, North Yorkshire, East Yorkshire, Northern Lincolnshire, Northumberland, Tyne and Wear, Shropshire, Staffordshire, Trent and West Midlands South whereby fluoridation was introduced progressively in the years between 1964 and 1988.

The South Central Strategic Health Authority carried out the first public consultation under the Water Act 2003, and in 2009 its board voted to fluoridate water supplies in the Southampton area to address the high incidence of tooth decay in children there. Surveys had found that the majority of surveyed Southampton residents opposed the plan, but the Southampton City Primary Care Trust decided that "public vote could not be the deciding factor and that medical evidence shows fluoridation will reduce tooth decay – and failed to back up claims of serious negative side effects". Fluoridation plans in the northwest of England were delayed after concerns over increased projected costs and health risks were raised. In October 2014, Public Health England abandoned plans for water fluoridation for 195,000 people in Southampton and neighbouring parts of south-west Hampshire due to opposition from both Hampshire County Council and Southampton City Council.

It was reported in 2007 that the UK Milk Fluoridation Programme, centered in the northwest of England, involved more than 16,000 children.

The water supply in Northern Ireland has never been artificially fluoridated except in two small localities where fluoride was added to the water for about 30 years. By 1999, fluoridation ceased in those two areas, as well.

In 2004, following a public consultation, Scotland's parliament rejected proposals to fluoridate public drinking water.

There are currently no community fluoridation schemes in Wales. The Welsh Government stated in November 2014 that it had no plans to fluoridate the water supply, but said that it was something the Welsh Government will continue to review.

In September 2021, the UK's chief medical officers concluded that fluoridation of water supplies would cut tooth decay.

== North America ==
=== Canada ===
The decision to fluoridate lies with local governments, with guidelines set by provincial, territorial, and federal governments. Brantford, Ontario, became the first city in Canada to fluoridate its water supplies in 1945. In 1955, Toronto approved water fluoridation, but delayed implementation of the program until 1963 due to a campaign against fluoridation by broadcaster Gordon Sinclair. The city continues to fluoridate its water as of 2025.

In 2008, the recommended fluoride levels in Canada were reduced from 0.8 to 1.0 mg/L to 0.7 mg/L to minimize the risk of dental fluorosis. Ontario, Alberta, and Manitoba have the highest rates of fluoridation, about 70–75%. The lowest rates are in Quebec (about 6%), British Columbia (about 4% - Vancouver does not add Fluoride), and Newfoundland and Labrador (1.5%), with Nunavut and the Yukon having no fluoridation at all. Overall, about 45% of the Canadian population had access to fluoridated water supplies in 2007. A 2008 telephone survey found that about half of Canadian adults knew about fluoridation, and of these, 62% supported the idea.

In 2010, the Region of Waterloo held a non-binding referendum for residents to decide whether water fluoridation should continue. The result of the vote was 50.3% voting against fluoridation. The regional council honored the vote, and over forty years of fluoridation in Waterloo Region ended in November.

In 2011, Calgary city council voted 10–3 to stop adding fluoride to the city's drinking water, having started water fluoridation in 1991. A research project has been planned to study the effects of Calgary's cessation, using Edmonton as a control.

Lakeshore and Amherstberg have voted to end water fluoridation.

Hamilton, London, and Toronto have recently chosen to continue fluoridation. Toronto treats its water to 0.6 mg/L.

Fluoridation was gradually abandoned in the province of Quebec, with Montreal stopping the treatment in the areas where it was still in operation in 2024, leaving St-George as the last municipality in the province to maintain it.

On 28 January 2013, Windsor city council voted 8–3 to cease fluoridation of Windsor's drinking water for five years, honoring a February 2012 recommendation by the Windsor Utilities Commission. Tecumseh gets its water from Windsor, and Tecmuseh's council had voted on 13 March 2012 to ask Windsor to stop fluoridating. Money formerly spent on fluoridation was reallocated to oral health and nutrition education programs. Windsor's water had been fluoridated for over fifty years. On 14 December 2018, Windsor city council voted 8–3 to reintroduce fluoridation of Windsor's drinking water. According to the Oral Health 2018 report released by the health unit, the percentage of children with tooth decay or requiring urgent care has increased by 51 per cent in 2016–17 compared to 2011–12.

In 2021, Regina, Saskatchewan, city council voted to add fluoride to the city's drinking water with the program expected to start once upgrades to the Buffalo Water Treatment plant are completed in 2025. Communities such as Saskatoon and Moose Jaw fluoridate their water, while others do not.

=== Mexico ===
Mexico has no water fluoridation program; instead it has a table salt fluoridation program. But the potable water in Mexico City has higher levels of fluoride than recommended by WHO.

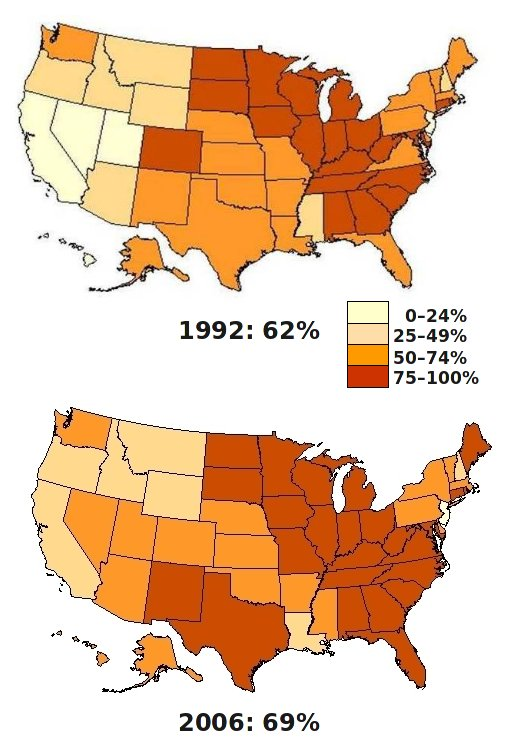
U.S. residents served with community water fluoridation, 1992 and 2006. The percentages are the proportions of the resident population served by public water supplies who are receiving fluoridated water.

=== United States ===
As of May 2000, 42 of the 50 largest U.S. cities had water fluoridation. In 2010, 66% of all U.S. residents and 74% of U.S. residents with access to community water systems receive fluoridated water. In 2010, a U.S. Centers for Disease Control and Prevention study determined that "40.7% of adolescents aged 12–15 had dental fluorosis [in 1999–2004]". In response, in 2011 the U.S. Department of Health and Human Services and the U.S. Environmental Protection Agency (EPA) proposed to reduce the recommended level of fluoride in drinking water to the lowest end of the current range, 0.7 milligrams per liter of water (mg/L), from the previous recommended maximum of 0.7 to 1.2 mg/L in recognition of the increase in sources of fluoride such as fluoridated toothpastes and mouthwashes. This could effectively terminate municipal water fluoridation in areas where fluoride levels from mineral deposits and industrial pollution exceed the new recommendation. As of 2021 the federal maximum contaminant level for fluoride in public water systems remains at 4.0 mg/L, which had been promulgated by EPA in 1986. Several states have set more stringent standards, including New York, where the fluoride MCL is 2.2 mg/L.

As of 2023, approximately 73% of the U.S. population continues to receive fluoridated water. In the same year, the CDC reported that water fluoridation prevents roughly 25% of cavities in children and adults. Despite this, debates about the safety and necessity of fluoridation persist. Some municipalities, such as Portland, Oregon, have chosen not to fluoridate their water, citing concerns over potential health risks and the ethical implications of mass medication. Conversely, areas like San Francisco, California, have maintained their fluoridation programs, emphasizing the public health benefits, particularly for low-income populations who may have limited access to dental care. A 2022 study in the Journal of Public Health Dentistry found that cessation of water fluoridation in Calgary, Alberta, led to an increase in dental caries among children, reinforcing the CDC's stance on the importance of fluoridation.

== Oceania ==
=== Australia ===
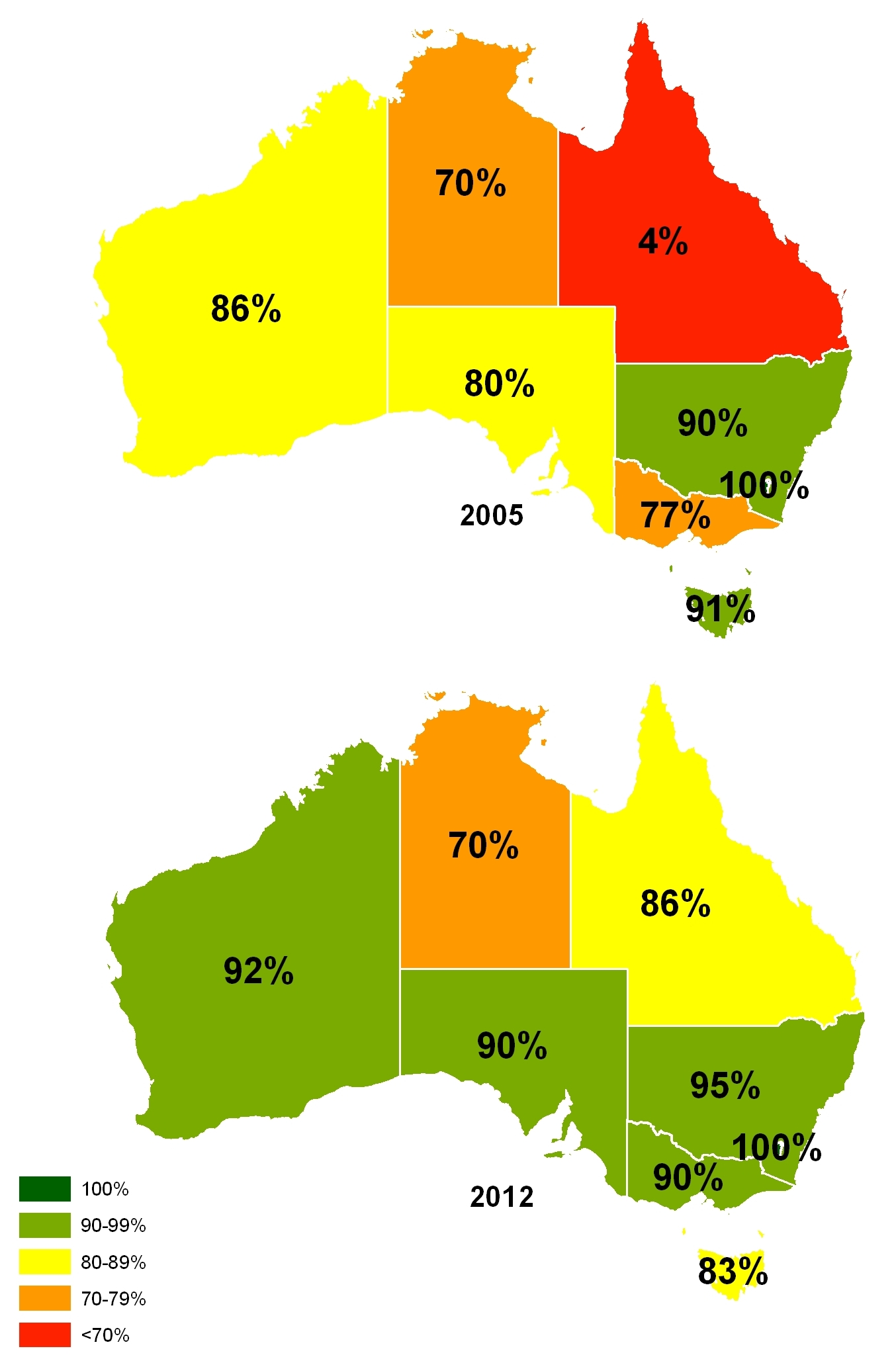
Australian residents served with community water fluoridation, 2005 and 2012. The percentages are the proportions of the resident population served by public water supplies who are receiving fluoridated water.

Australia now provides fluoridated water for 70% or more of the population in all states and territories. Many of Australia's drinking water supplies began fluoridation in the 1960s and 1970s. By 1984 almost 66% of the Australian population had access to fluoridated drinking water, represented by 850 towns and cities. Some areas within Australia have natural fluoride levels in the groundwater, which was estimated in 1991 to provide drinking water to approximately 0.9% of the population.

The first town to fluoridate the water supply in Australia was Beaconsfield, Tasmania in 1953. Queensland became the last state to formally require the addition of fluoride to public drinking water supplies in December 2008, though since 2012 exceptions have been granted on the basis of cost. In 2023, 72% of Queenslanders have access to fluoridated water (mostly in the south east), while 53 out of 77 councils do not have fluoridated water (18 have fluoride added, the remaining have naturally high levels).

=== Fiji ===
In 2011, Water Authority of Fiji announced that it would add fluoride to water supplied to residents of the Suva-Nausori corridor, with the long term goal of adding fluoride to water nationwide.

=== New Zealand ===
The use of water fluoridation first began in Hastings, New Zealand in 1954. A Commission of Inquiry was held in 1957 and then its use rapidly expanded in the mid 1960s. New Zealand now has fluoridated water supplied to about half of the total population. Of the six main centers, only Christchurch and Tauranga do not have a fluoridated water supply. Wellington's water supply is mostly fluoridated, but the suburbs of Petone and Korokoro receive a non-fluoridated supply. In Auckland, the suburbs Onehunga and Huia Village do not fluoridate water.

In 2013, a Hamilton City Council committee voted to remove fluoride from late June 2013. A referendum was held during the council elections in October 2013 with approximately 70% of voters voting for fluoride to be added back into the water supply, and in March 2014, the council voted 9 to 1 to re-introduce fluoride into the supply. In a 2007 referendum about half of voters in the Central Otago, South Otago and the Southland Region did not want fluoridation and voters in the Waitaki District were against water fluoridation for all Wards. Ashburton and Greymouth also voted against fluoridation.

In 2014, the Prime Minister's Chief Science Advisor and the Royal Society of New Zealand published a report on the health effects of water fluoridation.

In June 2018, the Supreme Court of New Zealand in New Health New Zealand Inc v South Taranaki District Council upheld the legality of water fluoridation in New Zealand.

In late July 2022, Director-General of Health Ashley Bloomfield ordered 14 territorial authorities to add fluoride to their water supplies. Bloomfield stated that this measure would boost the number of the New Zealand population receiving water fluoridation by from 51% to 60%.

== Central and South America ==
=== Argentina ===
As of 2012, 21% of the Argentinian population had fluoridated water. The capital city, Buenos Aires, has its water fluoridated via a local scheme.

=== Brazil ===
By 2008, 41% of people (73.2 million) in Brazil were getting artificially fluoridated water.

Water fluoridation was first adopted in Brazil in the city of Baixo Guandu, ES, in 1953. A 1974 federal law required new or enlarged water treatment plants to have fluoridation, and its availability was greatly expanded in the 1980s, with optimum fluoridation levels set at 0.8 mg/L. Today, the expansion of fluoridation in Brazil is a governmental priority; Between 2005 and 2008, fluoridation became available to 7.6 million people in 503 municipalities. As of 2008, 3,351 municipalities (60.6%) had adopted fluoridation, up from 2,466 in 2000.

=== Chile ===
In Chile, 70.5% of the population receives fluoridated water (10.1 million added by chemical means, 604,000 naturally occurring). The Biobio Region is the only administrative division that doesn't fluoridate water.

=== Colombia ===
In Bogota, the average drinking water fluoride concentration is 0.08 ppm. Medellin is the only city which preserves an annual oral health prevention programme based on education and fluoridated mouth rinses in public schools since 1981, and its drinking water contains an average Fluoride concentration of 0.05 ppm. Cartagena is located in the coastal region of Colombia, presenting one of the highest average temperatures in the country and its drinking water has an average Fluoride concentration of 0.08 ppm.

The average fluoride residing in Bogota and Medellin is comparable with the values reported for the optimally fluoridated water of Indianapolis.

=== Guatemala ===
As of 2012, 1,800,000 people received fluoridated water, amounting to 13% of the population.

=== Guyana ===
In Guyana, 245,000 people, or 32% of the population, have access to fluoridated water. Of those with access, 45,000 have access to artificially fluoridated water, with the rest being naturally fluoridation.

=== Panama ===
By 2012, over 15% (510,000 people) of the population were receiving artificially fluoridated water. There are fluoridation schemes in Panama City and San Miguelito.

=== Paraguay ===
Approximately 6% of the population, or 350,000 people, receive fluoridated water as of 2012.

=== Peru ===
An estimated 80,000 people drink naturally fluoridated water, with 500,000 people receiving artificially fluoridated water. This amounts to 2% of the population.

=== Venezuela ===
Following an unsuccessful rollout of water fluoridation, the government began a salt fluoridation program in 1995. Fluoride levels were introduced at a level of 60–90 mgF per kg of salt. This concentration was later raised to 180-220 mgF per kg, considered the appropriate range for preventing dental caries in the Latin American population who are at a minimal risk of dental fluorosis. In markets, around 80% of table salt is fluoridated.
