= Silver diammine fluoride =

Chemical compound

Clinical data
- Trade names: Fagamin, Advantage Arrest
- Other names: Diammine Silver Fluoride, Diamine silver fluoride
- ATC code: None

Legal status
- Legal status: US: ℞-only and 510(k) cleared class II medical device

Identifiers
- IUPAC name: Diamminesilver(I) fluoride
- CAS Number: 34445-07-3
- ChemSpider: 142121
- UNII: DDU19UEV1Y
- CompTox Dashboard (EPA): DTXSID70955992

Chemical and physical data
- Formula: AgFH_{6}N_{2}
- Molar mass: 160.929 g·mol^{−1}
- 3D model (JSmol): Interactive image
- SMILES: F[Ag]([NH3])[NH3]
- InChI: InChI=InChI=1S/Ag.FH.2H3N/h;1H;2*1H3/q+1;;;/p-1

Silver diammine fluoride (SDF), also known as silver diamine fluoride in most of the dental literature (although this is a chemical misnomer), is a topical medication used to treat and prevent dental caries (tooth decay) and relieve dentinal hypersensitivity. It is a colorless (most products) or blue-tinted (Advantage Arrest, SilverSense SDF), odourless liquid composed of silver, ammonium and fluoride ions at a pH of 10.4 (most products) or 13 (Riva Star). Ammonia compounds reduce the oxidative potential of SDF, increase its stability and helps to maintain a constant concentration over a period of time, rendering it safe for use in the mouth. Silver and fluoride ions possess antimicrobial properties and are used in the remineralization of enamel and dentin on teeth for preventing and arresting dental caries.

SDF is also known as diammine silver fluoride, silver fluoride, and silver ammonium fluoride. It is frequently spelled "silver diamine fluoride" (with one m); however, this is a misnomer, as SDF contains two ammine (NH_{3}) groups, not amine (NH_{2}) groups.

Based on the current, best available evidence, SDF can be used by licensed dental professionals. In the UK, this is classified as 'off-label' use of a topical medicament for arresting caries as it is licensed for treatment of dentine hypersensitivity. It is supported by a robust, extensive evidence base with regard to its efficacy and can be used as long as the following criteria are realised: there is a body of evidence supporting its efficacy; and there is no alternative, licensed medicine.

The product was cleared for sale by the U.S. Food and Drug Administration as a Class II medical device for the treatment of dentinal hypersensitivity, and has been classified as an 'effective, efficient, equitable and safe caries-preventative agent' by the Institute of Medicine and the Millennium Goals of the World Health Organization in 2009.

It is on the World Health Organization's List of Essential Medicines, first added in 2021 for dental caries.

== Brand names ==
- Argentina: 38% SDF solution, Fluoroplat, TEDEQUIM Laboratories, Córdoba, Argentina. 38% SDF Solution, FAgamin, Bv. de los Poles 6136, Córdoba, Argentina.
- Japan: 38% SDF solution, Saforide, Toyo Seiyaku Kasei Co. Ltd., Osaka, Japan.
- Thailand: 38% SDF solution: Topamine, PharmaDesign Thailand/Dentalife Australia, e-SDF (Caliham Group)
- USA: 38% SDF solution, Advantage Arrest, Elevate Oral Care LLC, West Palm Beach, Florida, USA; SilverSense SDF, Centrix, Inc., Shelton, CT, USA.
- India: 38% SDF solution, e-SDF (Kids-e-dental LLP, India)
- Australia: 38% SDF solution, Riva Star, unit doses, SDI, TOPAMINE (Dentalife Australia)
- (there are 30%, 12%, and 10% SDFs available from Argentina and Brazil. CarieStop and others.)

== Indications and Contraindications of SDF ==
=== Indications ===
An example of a SDF Patient Information Leaflet for parents and children to allow discussion over treatment. It shows teeth with tooth decay before, and after, treatment with SDF where the tooth decay has become darkly stained.

SDF use is indicated in the clinical scenarios listed below.

==== Patients ====
- With severe caries risk due to xerostomia (dry mouth from reduced salivary flow);
- Severe early childhood caries, which does not typically resolve with operative treatment.
- Babies and toddlers with Early Childhood Caries;
- Pre-cooperative children, to slow down the progress of the disease prior to building cooperation for treatment;
- Patients with physical or cognitive disabilities or dental phobia for whom more invasive procedures are not appropriate;
- Where aerosol generating procedures (AGPs) are unable to be performed or approved;
- With no or limited access to dental centres owing to its ease of use and minimal equipment requirement.

==== Teeth ====
- Carious primary teeth showing radiographic evidence of being close to exfoliation;
- Non-restorable asymptomatic teeth where extraction is contra-indicated;
- With symptomatic Molar-Incisal Hypomineralization (MIH) to ease dentin hypersensitivity and slow down disease progress;
- With active root surface carious lesions;
- No symptoms of an irreversible inflammation of the dental pulp.

=== Contraindications ===
The use of SDF is contraindicated in the following scenarios:

==== Patients ====
- With an allergy to Silver or compounds containing silver;
- With ulcerative gingivitis or stomatitis; due to pain, can be managed with cautious use of a mucosal covering.
- Unable to tolerate treatment.

==== Teeth ====
- With irreversible pulpitis or direct pulp exposure.
- Where it is not possible to achieve adequate isolation of tooth and oral tissues.

== Mode of action ==
SDF's mode of action is well documented, but remains contested. Rosenblatt et al. summarized how the constituents in SDF each have a role in the arrest of microbial species that cause dental caries. The higher the concentration of fluoride in a compound, the more effective its mechanisms in inhibiting bacterial biofilm formation. Fluorides can bind to bacterial cell walls, inhibiting enzymatic processes associated with sugar uptake and metabolism of carbohydrate, therefore producing a surface more resistant to acid dissolution.

Similarly, the silver in SDF kills cariogenic bacteria by interacting with DNA and cellular proteins. This leads to cessation of cellular metabolism preventing bacterial cell wall synthesis and DNA synthesis, and ATP production. These actions destroy plaque biofilms, and subsequently arrest dental caries.

SDF hardens carious dentin, such that it is twice as hard as healthy dentin

=== Effect on cariogenic bacteria ===
Colony Forming Unit counts (CFU) and studies of multispecies carious biofilms were carried aiming to examine the action of SDF on cariogenic bacteria. CFU counts on Streptococci mutans, Actinomyces naeslundii, Lactobacillus acidophilus, Streptococcus sobrinus, Lactobacillus rhamnosus (all of which are bacteria intimately associated with the carious process) were significant lower in both dentin surfaces and demineralized dentin treated with SDF when compared to water application. SDF also inhibits the adherence of S.mutans to tooth surfaces.

Targino et al. (2014) reported that minimum bacterial concentration and minimum inhibitory concentration of SDF for S.mutans were 50.0 ug/mL and 33.3 ug/mL respectively. This shows that SDF as a compound has better bactericidal effects than silver ammonium nitrate and sodium fluoride (commonly found in toothpastes).

=== Effect on organic content on dentin ===
The affected layer of carious dentin in teeth can be identified by the presence of intact collagen fibres. Studies have revealed that a larger amount of intact collagen fibres remain on dentine surfaces (perpendicular to the enamel dentine junction) when treated with SDF as compared to water.

SDF inhibits proteolytic activities such as enzymatic degradation of collagen fibres by matrix metalloproteinases MMP-2, 8 and 9. Furthermore, SDF stops the degradation of cysteine cathepsins, which are also responsible for dentine collagen degradation.

=== Recommended concentration ===
A systematic review conducted by Contreras et al. in 2017 concluded that 30% and 38% concentrations of SDF were most effective for caries arrest. One of the clinical trials in this systematic review found 38% SDF to be significantly more effective for the prevention of caries in primary teeth, with 80% fewer new lesions in primary teeth, and 65% fewer new lesions in first permanent molars. Yee et al. (2009) compared the effectiveness of 38% against 12% SDF, with or without using a reducing agent for the caries arrest. Over a 24-month period, it was concluded that there was a higher rate of lesion arrest in teeth treated with 38% SDF (with and without the reducing agents) as compared to 12% SDF.

=== Frequency of application ===
A randomised clinical trial conducted by Zhi et al. (2012) found that increasing the frequency of SDF application from once to twice per year increased the rate of caries arrest. The American Academy of Paediatric Dentistry (AAPD) recommends a 2-4 week follow-up to assess the arrest of carious lesions treated with SDF. If the lesions do not appear to have arrested (i.e. dark in colour and tactilely hard), it is suggested by them to reapply. Subsequent restoration of the carious lesion may be indicated following the application of SDF to restore aesthetics. If these lesions are not restored following SDF application, the AAPD recommends application biannually, as this has shown an increased caries lesion arrest rate as compared to annual application.

=== Maximum dose ===
Average LD50 in mice and rats by oral administration was 520 mg/kg, and by subcutaneous administration was 380 mg/kg. The subcutaneous route is taken here as a worst-case scenario. One drop (32.5 μL) is ample material to treat 5 teeth, and contains 12.35 mg silver diamine fluoride. Assuming the smallest child with caries would be in the range of 10 kg, the dose would be 1.235 mg / kg child. Based on this, UCSF recommended 1 drop per 10 kg of body weight per visit.

The US FDA reviewed the dose limit based on all evidence for the US multi-centered clinical trial sponsored by the NIH and FDA run by UM, NYU, and UIowa, and set a dose limit of 260 μL for any patient 12 – 59 months old at the start of the study. ClinicalTrials.gov Identifier: NCT03649659.

== Precautions and adverse effects ==
The main side effect of SDF is non-medical and is the prominent black staining of carious tooth tissue where the solution is applied.

SDF will stain most things it touches, including skin, mucous membranes, clothing and work surfaces. Chu et al. reported on the first modern clinical trial of SDF that the stain was generally acceptable and "the presence of darkened teeth was mentioned by around 7% of the parents."

Another side effect is an intensely bitter metallic flavor, which subsides in minutes.

No serious adverse reactions (e.g. life-threatening reactions, hospitalization, toxicity or death) have been reported in the scientific literature. Two safety studies have been done in children.

Pharmacokinetic studies in adults found no adverse effects and demonstrated a lack of any increase of Fluoride in the blood. Increases in serum Silver were observed.

Systematic reviews reported adverse reactions following SDF use. These reactions manifested as small, white lesions of the oral mucosa that healed over the course of 48 hours. Furthermore, an umbrella review by Seifo et al. (2020) did not report any serious adverse reactions.

== Arresting caries progression ==
- A systematic review and meta-analysis from 2017 by Chibinski et al. analysed the arrest of caries in primary teeth over a 12-month period. SDF was able to arrest caries at a 66% higher (95% CI 41-91%; p < 0.00001) rate than any other active material, and 154% (95% CI 67-85%; p < 0.00001) more than placebos. Overall, the study concluded that caries arrest was 89% higher (95% CI 49-138%; p < 0.00001) in SDF as compared to using any other active materials or placebos.
- A further systematic review and meta-analysis by Trieu et al. (2019) concluded that SDF works more effectively for the arrest of dentine caries as compared to high concentration sodium fluoride preparations (e.g. Duraphat varnish). The evidence from this meta-analysis is considered strong.
- Gao et al. (2016) reviewed 19 studies, 16 of which considered primary (baby) teeth and 3 on permanent (adult) teeth. The associated meta-analysis included 8 studies and revealed that 38% SDF (44,800ppm Fluoride) had achieved caries arrest in 86% of (95% confidence interval [CI], 47% to 98%; P = 0.06) dentinal carious lesions in primary teeth at six months interval, 81% (95% CI, 59% to 93%; P = 0.01) at 12 months and 65% (95% CI, 35% to 86%; P = 0.32) at 24 months. Overall, 81% of active caries lesions had arrested following SDF treatment.
- Horst (2018) reviewed 10 clinical trials in children and adults and suggested "to skip the rinsing step due to demonstration of safety in young children, start patients with high disease severity on an intensive regimen of multiple applications over the first few weeks, and continue with semiannual maintenance doses as previously suggested."
- An umbrella review by Seifo et al. (2019) found that SDF was favoured as a treatment option for the arrest and prevention of root caries lesions. As for coronal caries lesions, comparisons were drawn between SDF, fluoride varnish, glass ionomer cement and placebos as treatment modalities. It was found that SDF had the highest caries arrest rate.
- A systematic review of caries prevention by SDF in children with a low threshold for inclusion - any comparative clinical study with a control or placebo group - found a 61% preventive fraction.
- One systematic review also presented and concluded that SDF may potentially be a treatment option for the prevention of caries in first permanent molars however the evidence to support this is inconclusive.

== History ==
- Dental use of silver nitrate can be traced back to Japan around 1000 AD, where it was used for cosmetic purposes of blackening of teeth. Silver nitrate followed by application of fluoride varnish was the only non-invasive option available for caries treatment before the advent for silver diamine fluoride (SDF). Cases of carious lesions treated and arrested by the application of silver nitrate date to 19th century. Medical research study that dates back to 19th century showed 87 of 142 treated carious lesions were arrested.
- Silver diamine was formed when ammonia was added to silver nitrate to make it stable and effective as an antibacterial for application to caries lesions and infected root canals.
- SDF was developed by Reichi Yamaga, Misuho Nishino, and colleagues to prevent and treat dental caries.
- SDF was approved by PMDA (equivalent of FDA) in 1970 in Japan and has been used there since.
- SDF has been widely used in Australia and Brazil since 1980 with in vivo studies done in the respective countries.
- In 2014 the FDA cleared SDF as a medical device for treating dental hypersensitivity.
- In January 2016 in the US, a new Code on Dental Procedures and Nomenclature (CDT), D1354, allowed billing claims for off-label use of SDF as an interim caries-arresting medicine.
- In 2017, Canada approved use to treat dental caries.
