= Fluoride varnish =

Highly concentrated form of fluoride

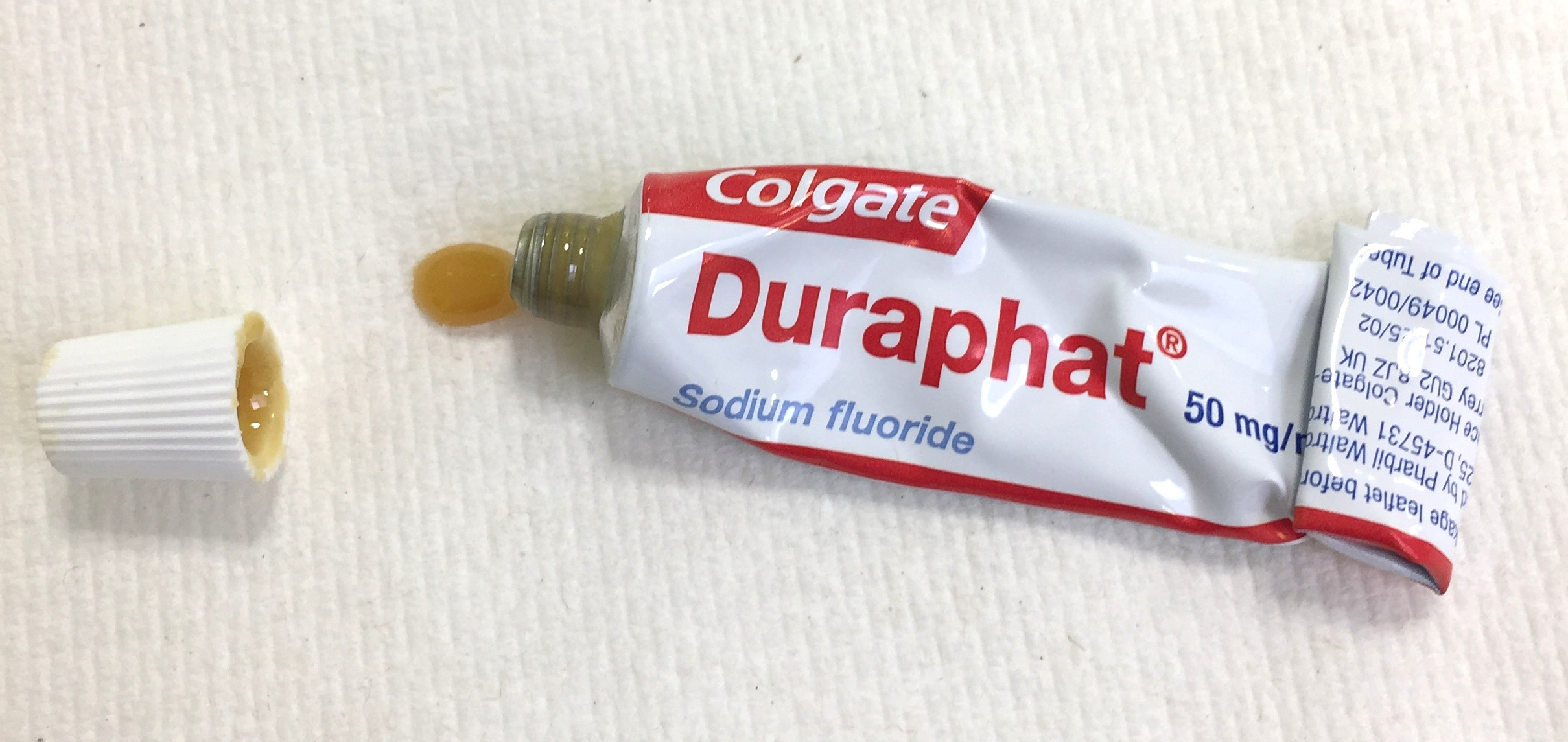
Tube of Colgate Duraphat fluoride varnish

Fluoride varnish is a highly concentrated form of fluoride that is applied to the tooth's surface by a dentist, dental hygienist or other dental professional, as a type of topical fluoride therapy. It is not a permanent varnish but due to its adherent nature it is able to stay in contact with the tooth surface for several hours. It may be applied to the enamel, dentine or cementum of the tooth and can be used to help prevent decay, remineralise the tooth surface and to treat dentine hypersensitivity. There are more than 30 fluoride-containing varnish products on the market today, and they have varying compositions and delivery systems. These compositional differences lead to widely variable pharmacokinetics, the effects of which remain largely untested clinically.

Fluoride varnishes are relatively new in the United States, but they have been widely used in western Europe, Canada, South Africa and the Scandinavian countries since the 1980s as a dental caries prevention therapy. They are recognised by the Food and Drug Administration for use as desensitising agents, but, currently, not as an anti-decay agent. Both Canadian and European studies have reported that fluoride varnish is as effective in preventing tooth decay as professionally applied fluoride gel; however, it is not in widespread use for this purpose.

Fluoride varnish is composed of a high concentration of fluoride as a salt or silane-based preparation in a fast drying, alcohol and resin based solution. The concentration, form of fluoride, and dispensing method may vary depending on the manufacturer. While most fluoride varnishes contain 5% sodium fluoride at least one brand of fluoride varnish contains 1% difluorsilane in a polyurethane base and one brand contains 2.5% sodium fluoride that has been milled to perform similar to 5% sodium fluoride products in a shellac base.

== Fluoride therapy ==
Fluoride therapy is the use of fluoride for medical purposes. Fluoride-containing toothpaste with a concentration of 1000 ppm or higher reduces the risk of dental caries in school-aged children and adolescents. Unlike the fluoride found in toothpaste or drinking water, in-office fluoride treatment is much more concentrated and more rapidly remineralizes weakened enamel.

Fluoride reduces the breakdown of tooth enamel by forming fluorapatite and becoming incorporated into the enamel. Fluoride ions decrease the rate of enamel demineralization and increase the rate of tooth remineralization in the early stages of caries.

== Clinical recommendations ==
A panel of experts convened by the American Dental Association (ADA) Council on Scientific Affairs presents evidence-based clinical recommendations regarding professionally applied, prescription-strength and home-use topical fluoride agents for caries prevention. The panel recommends the use of 2.26 percent fluoride varnish for people at risk of developing dental caries. As part of the evidence-based approach to care, these clinical recommendations should be integrated with a practitioner's professional judgment and the patient's needs and preferences.

=== United Kingdom ===
Fluoride varnish is widely used in the United Kingdom, following guidelines from multiple sources backing its efficacy. Public Health England, a UK government organisation sponsored by the Department of Health, released guidance in 2014 recommending fluoride varnish application at least twice yearly for children and young adults. Similarly, the Scottish Intercollegiate Guidelines Network and the Scottish Dental Clinical Effectiveness Programme have both released independent guidance recommending at least twice yearly fluoride varnish application, citing a strong clinical evidence base. SIGN recommends fluoride varnish at a concentration of 2.2%, while SDCEP recommends 15%.

== Types of varnish ==
Different varnish products release varying amounts of calcium, inorganic phosphate, and fluoride ions. MI varnish releases the most amounts of calcium ions and fluoride. Enamel Pro varnish releases the most inorganic phosphate ions. Each type of varnish is designed to be used in specific situations. To date, there have been no studies that show that altering the basic formulation recommended by the FDA will result in greater caries reduction.

== Effectiveness ==
There is some evidence that fluoride varnish treatment has a better outcome at preventing cavities at a lower cost compared to other fluoride treatments such as the fluoride mouth rinsing. For fluoride varnish treatment, the benefit to cost ratio 1.8:1, whereas fluoride mouth rinsing is 0.9:1. With fluoride varnish treatments, one can save by preventing future restorations. Fluoride varnish also requires fewer treatments for measurable effectiveness, therefore in the long run it is cost effective when compared to other treatments. A 2020 Cochrane systematic review found that while varnish may be effective at preventing cavities when applied to first permanent molars, there is no evidence to suggest if varnish is superior to resin-based fissure sealants. There is low quality evidence suggesting that when tooth surfaces were sealed and varnished with fluoride, as opposed to when varnished only with fluoride varnish, there may be an advantage.

== Advantages and disadvantages ==
=== Advantages ===
- Fluoride varnishes are available in different flavours which can be advantageous when treating younger patients
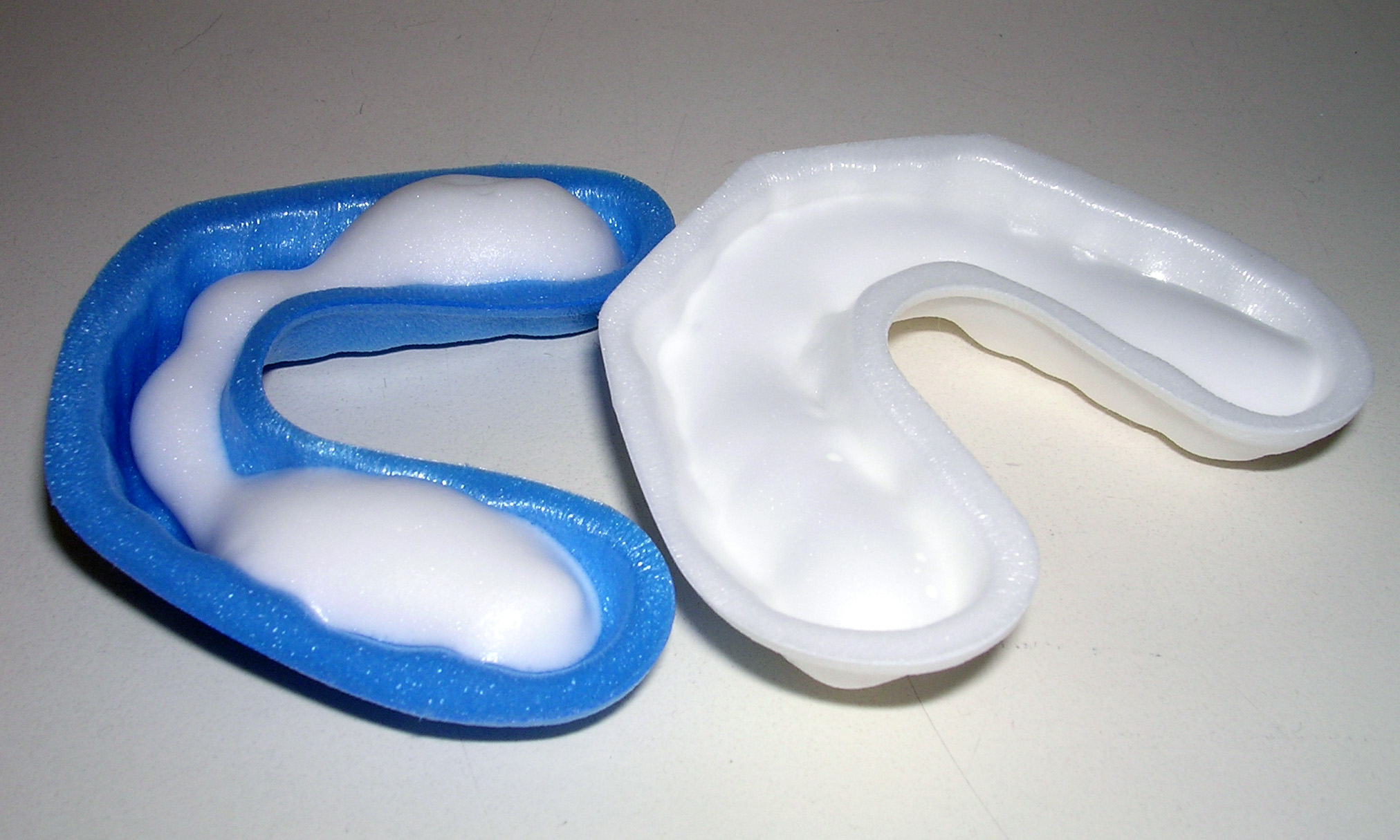
  Fluoride trays filled with fluoride foam
- They dry rapidly and will set even in the presence of saliva
- Because they do not require the use of fluoride trays they are suitable for use in patients with a strong gag reflex (See image to the right)
- Due to the small amounts used and the rapid setting time there is only a small or negligible amount of fluoride ingested
- It has a sticky consistency which helps it to adhere to the tooth's surface thereby allowing the fluoride to stay in contact with the tooth for several hours
- Based on published findings, professionally applied fluoride varnish does not appear to be a risk factor for dental fluorosis, even in children under the age of 6. This is due to the reduction in the amount of fluoride which may potentially be swallowed during the fluoride treatment because of the small quantities used and the adherence of the varnish to the teeth.
- Fluoride varnish treatments are shown to reduce the number of the cariogenic bacteria S. Mutans by over ten-fold.
- Fluoride varnish was a higher concentration than the foam and gel. There was not a significant difference in the amount of remineralization between gels, foams, and varnish. A study with a larger sample size and a longer time frame could show differing results.
- They can be applied easily and quickly

=== Disadvantages ===
- Due to the color of and adherence of some brands of fluoride varnish, they may cause a temporary change in the surface color of teeth as well as some filling materials. As the varnish is worn away by eating and brushing, the yellowish colour fades.
- Varnish costs more than gel and requires a prescription unlike the gel that is over the counter.
- They do not have the bitter taste of some fluoride gels, but in some patients the taste of the varnish can cause nausea especially when consuming food within the 24 hours post treatment.

== Indications and contraindications ==
=== Indications for use ===
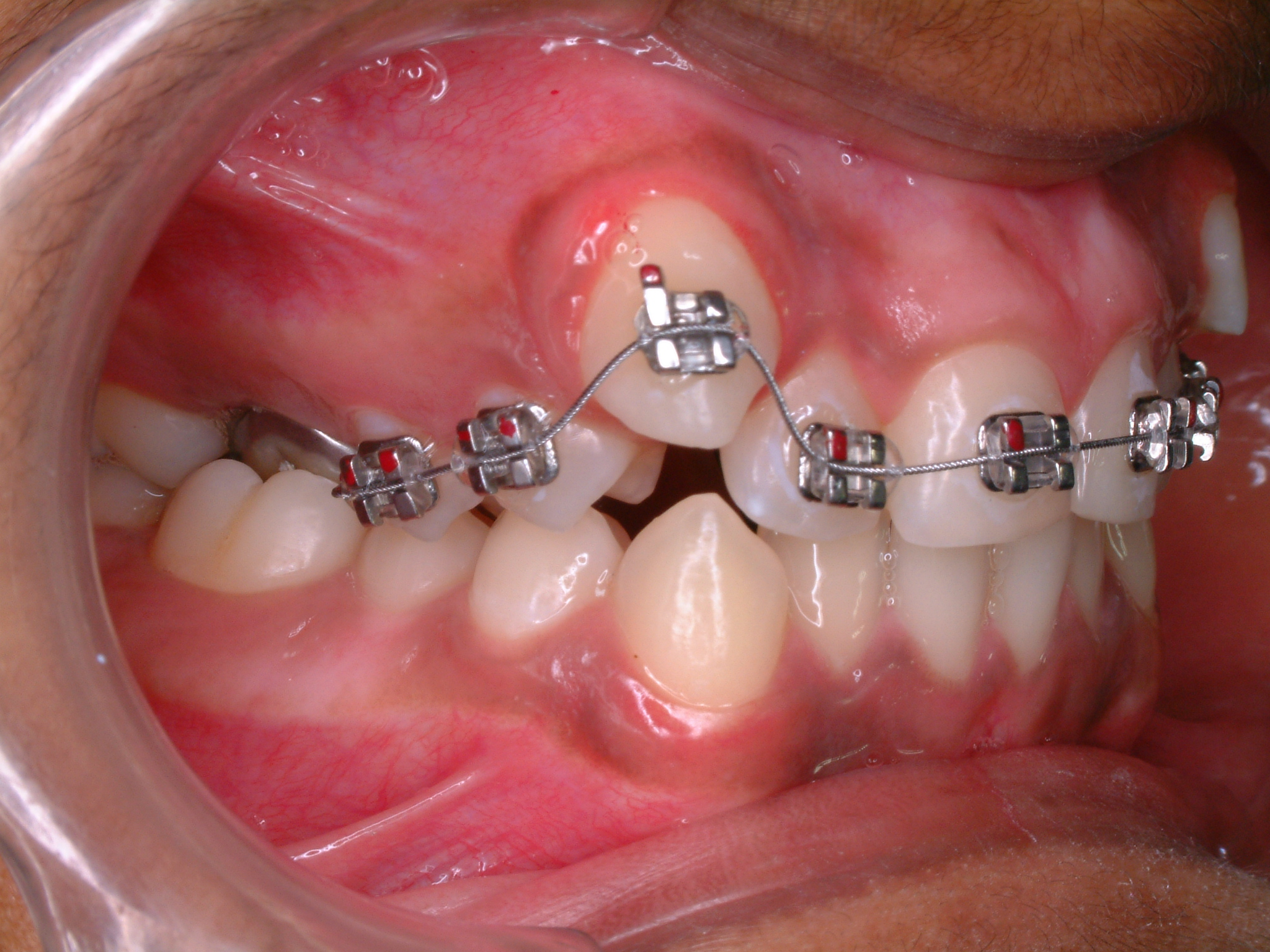
Orthodontic brackets

- Use as a topical fluoride agent on moderate and high-risk patients, especially children aged 5 and younger
- Desensitizing agent for exposed root surfaces
- Fluoridated cavity varnish
- When a higher concentration of fluoride is needed for high caries risk patients
- In the elderly to prevent increasingly prevalent root dentin lesions, which may require higher concentration of fluoride
- On advanced enamel carious lesions, which may also require higher fluoride concentration for remineralization
- Fluoride treatment for institutionalized patients or in other situations where setting, equipment and patient management might preclude the use of other fluoride delivery methods
- Caries prevention on exposed root surfaces
- Remineralization of lesions in root dentin
- Fluoride application around orthodontic bands and brackets (See image above)
- Fluoride treatment on patients when there is a concern that a fluoride rinse, gel or foam might be swallowed

=== Contraindications for use ===
- Areas with open cavities
- Patients that are at low-risk or are decay-free and live in an area where the water is fluoridated
- Treatment of areas where discoloration after treatment may be an aesthetic concern
- Fluoride varnish application is contraindicated in patient with ulcerative gingivitis and stomatitis.

== See also ==
- Dental caries
- Fluoride therapy
- Xerostomia
- Dental fluorosis
- Dentin hypersensitivity
- Dental restoration
- Dental surgery
