= Defluoridation =

Water sanitation procedure

Defluoridation is the downward adjustment of the level of fluoride in drinking water. Worldwide, fluoride is one of the most abundant anions present in groundwater. Fluoride is more present in groundwater than surface water mainly due to the leaching of minerals. Groundwater accounts for 98 percent of the earth's potable water. An excess of fluoride in drinking water causes dental fluorosis and skeletal fluorosis. The World Health Organization has recommended a guideline value of 1.5 mg/L as the concentration above which dental fluorosis is likely. Fluorosis is endemic in more than 20 developed and developing nations.

== History ==
Fluorosis was not identified as a problem until relatively recently. Few attempts to defluoridate water came before the 20th century. In the 1930s, several nations began to investigate fluoride's negative effects and how best to remove it. An aluminum and sand filter that removes fluorine from water was devised by Dr. S. P. Kramer in 1933; in 1945, M. Kenneth received a French patent for a water defluoridation technique; and in 1952, a functioning activated alumina community defluoridation plant was commissioned in Bartlett, Texas, USA.

== Techniques ==
While various defluoridation techniques have been explored, each has its limitations. Existing techniques are often too costly (because the geographic areas prone to fluorosis are among the poorest regions on the planet), ineffective or even dangerous (some of the remediation processes add other contaminants to the water). The main techniques that have been, and continue to be, investigated with varying degrees of success include: adsorption, precipitation, ion exchange and membrane processes.

Adsorption can be achieved with locally available adsorbent materials with high efficiency and cost-effectiveness. Cost-effective and locally available herbal and indigenous products offer promising options. The process is dependent on pH and the presence of sulfate, phosphate, and bicarbonate which results in ionic competition. Disposal of fluoride-laden sludge is problematic.

Precipitation is the most well-established and most widely used method, particularly at the community level. However, it has only moderate efficiency and a high chemical dose is required. Excessive use of aluminum salts produces sludge and adverse health effects through aluminum solubility.

The so-called Nalgonda technique for reduction of fluoride involves stirring in of alum and lime, whereupon some of the fluoride precipitates together with aluminum hydroxide, and the water can be decanted and filtered.

Ion Exchange removes fluoride up to 90-95% and retains the taste and colour of the water. Sulphates, phosphates, and bicarbonates also result in ionic competition in this method. Relatively high cost is a disadvantage and treated water sometimes has a low pH value and high levels of chloride.

Membrane processes are effective technique and do not require chemicals. It works at wide pH range and interference by other ions is negligible. Negatives include higher costs and it skilled labour. This process is not suitable for water with high salinity.

Calcium amended-hydroxyapatite is the most recent defluoridation technique in which aqueous calcium is amended to the fluoride contaminated water prior to contact with uncalcined synthetic hydroxyapatite adsorbent. In this novel defluoridation technique, amending aqueous calcium successfully prevents the dissolution of hydroxyapatite during the defluoridation and also enhances the defluoridation capacity of hydroxyapatite. In addition to these features, this ″calcium amended-hydroxyapatite″ defluoridation technique provides calcium-enriched alkaline drinking water and drinking of this defluoridated water may also help in fluorosis reversal. Thus, it is expected that utilization of this defluoridation technique to provide safe drinking water helps in the mitigation of fluorosis.
