= Ammonium bifluoride =

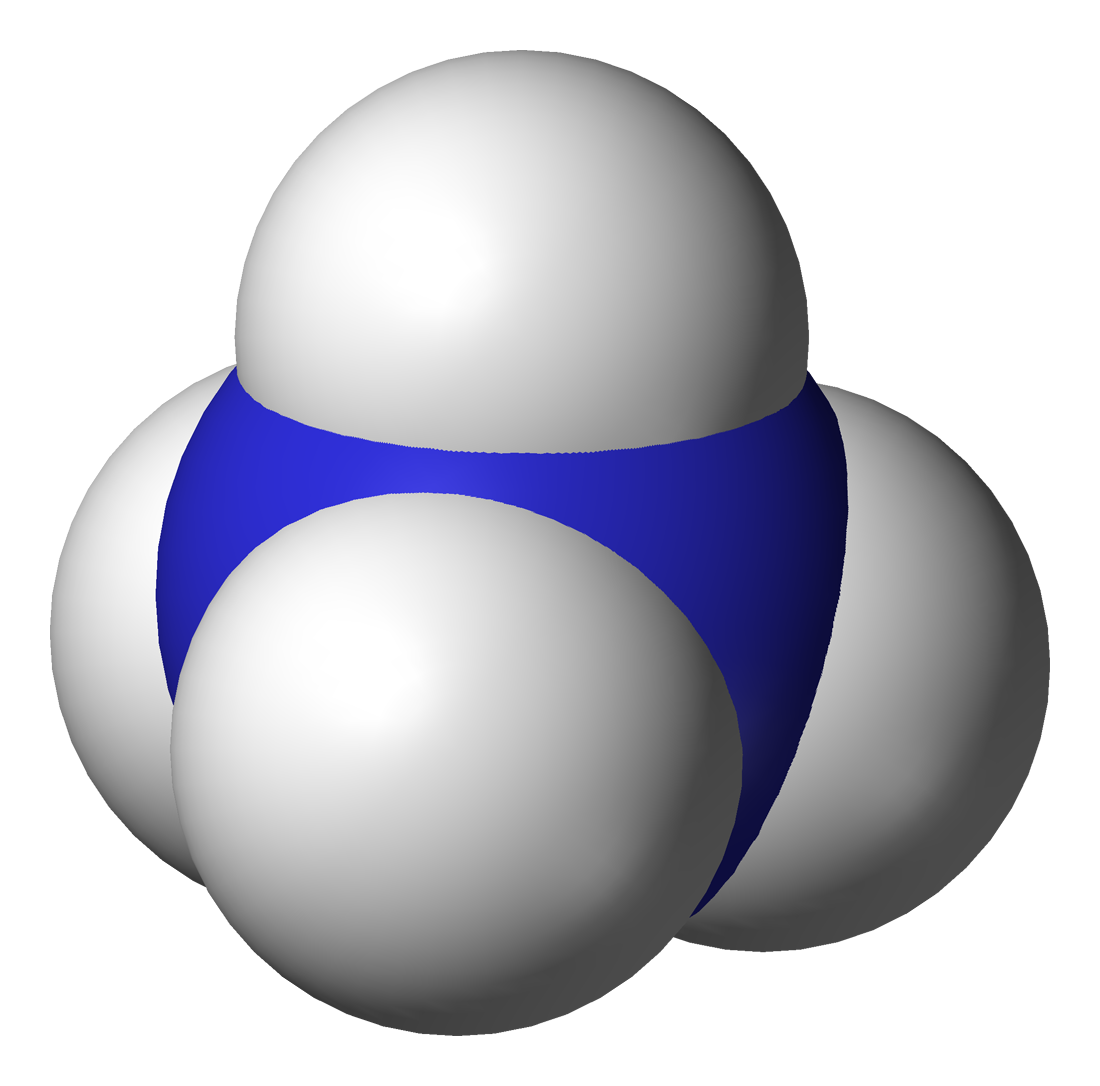
Space fill model of the ammonium cation
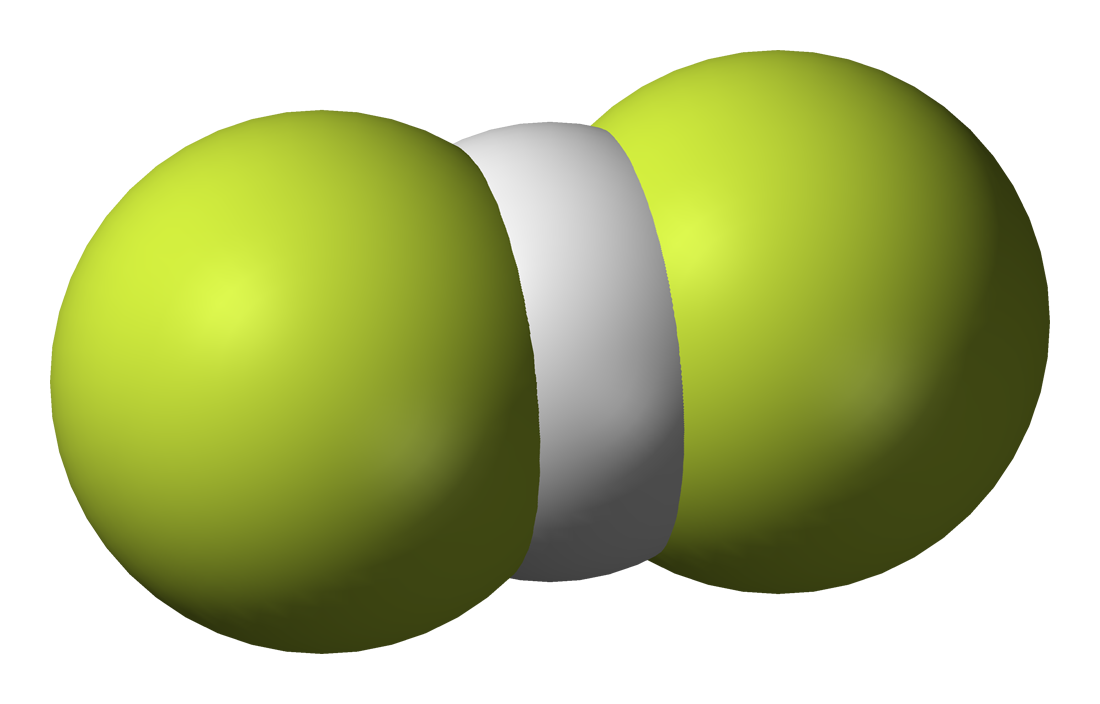
Space fill model of the bifluoride anion
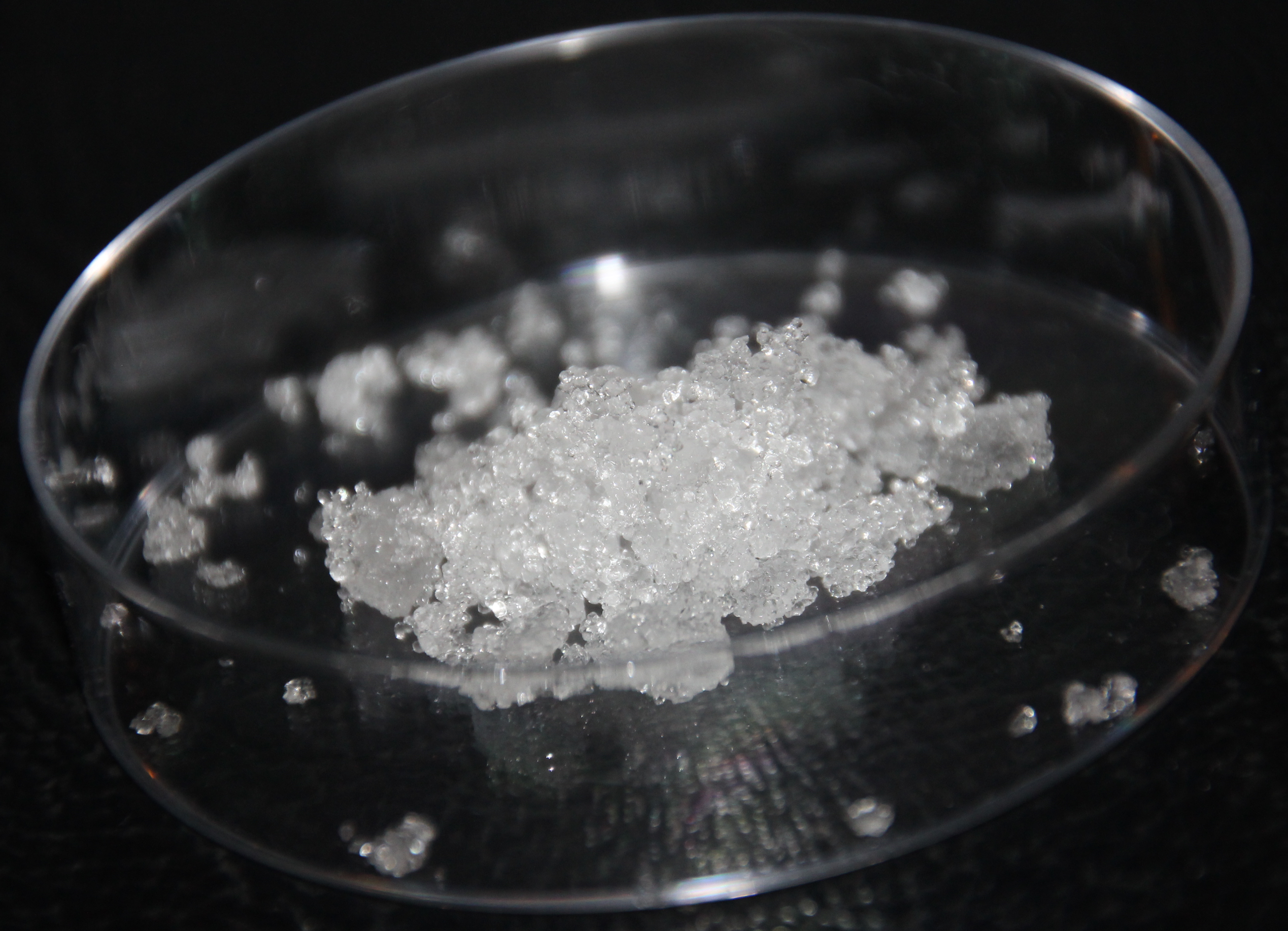
- Sample of Ammonium bifluoride

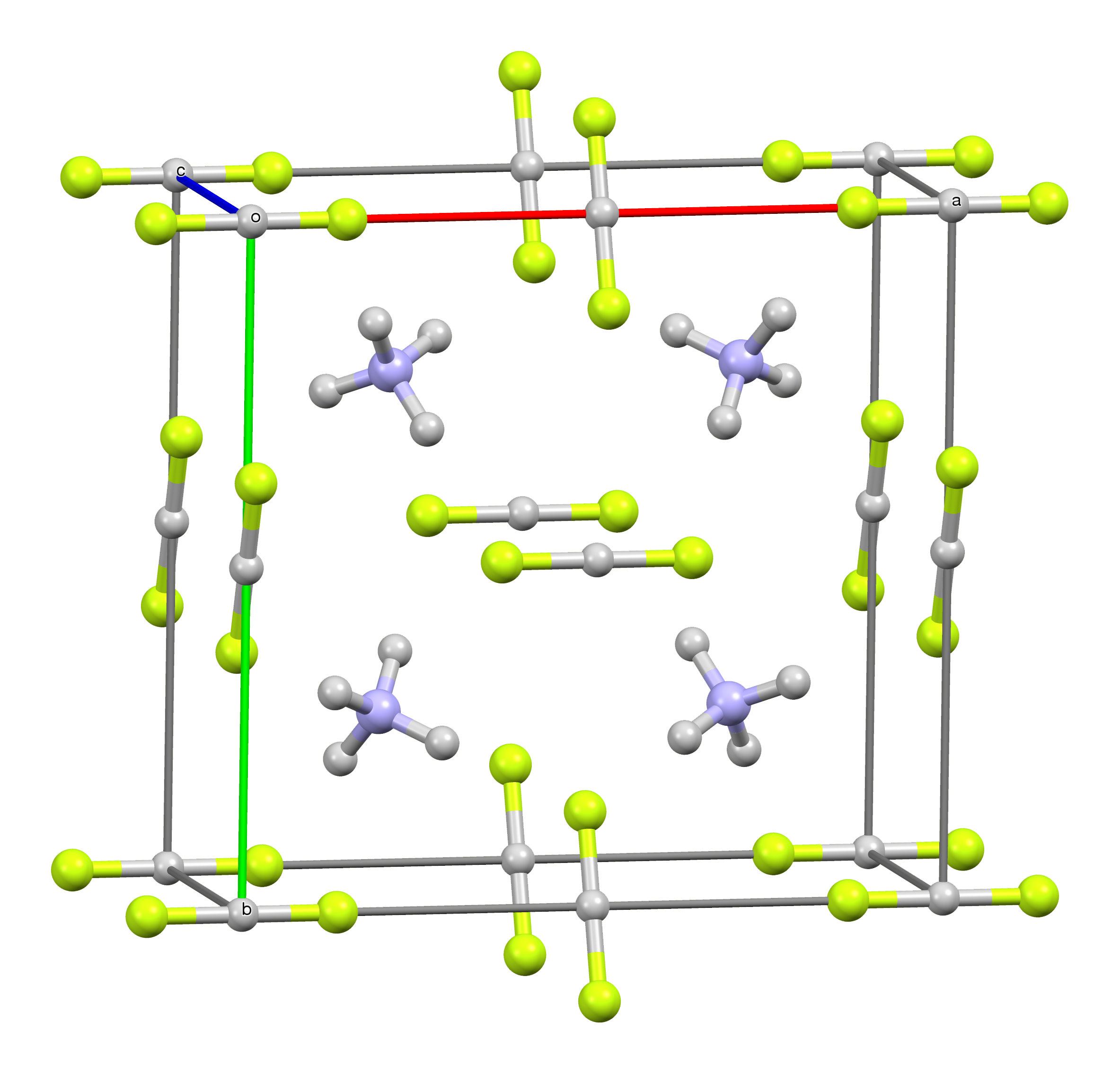

Names
- IUPAC name Ammonium bifluoride
- Other names: Ammonium acid fluoride; Ammonium hydrofluoride; Ammonium difluoride; Ammonium hydrogendifluoride; Ammonium hydrogen difluoride

Identifiers
CAS Number	1341-49-7
3D model (JSmol)	Interactive image; Interactive image
ChemSpider	21241205
ECHA InfoCard	100.014.252
EC Number	215-676-4
PubChem CID	14935
UNII	C2M215358O
UN number	1727
CompTox Dashboard (EPA)	DTXSID9029645
- InChI: InChI=1S/F2H.H3N/c1-3-2;/h;1H3/q-1;/p+1 Key: XIONBZYFLSJNBW-UHFFFAOYSA-O; InChI=1/2FH.H3N/h2*1H;1H3 Key: KVBCYCWRDBDGBG-UHFFFAOYAG
- SMILES: [NH4+].F[H-]F; [F-].F.[NH4+]

Properties
Chemical formula	[NH_{4}][HF_{2}]
Molar mass	57.044 g·mol^{−1}
Appearance	Colourless crystals
Density	1.50 g cm^{−3}
Melting point	126 °C (259 °F; 399 K)
Boiling point	240 °C (464 °F; 513 K)(decomposes)
Solubility in water	63g/(100 ml) (20 °C)
Solubility in alcohol	slightly soluble
Refractive index (n_{D})	1.390

Structure
Crystal structure	Cubic, related to the CsCl structure
Coordination geometry	[NH_{4}]^{+} cation: tetrahedral [HF_{2}]^{−} anion: linear

Hazards
- GHS labelling
Pictograms	(GHS05: Corrosive) (GHS06: Toxic)
Hazard statements	H301, H314
Precautionary statements	P280, P301+P310, P305+P351+P338, P310
NFPA 704 (fire diamond)	3 0 0

Related compounds
Other cations	potassium bifluoride
Related compounds	ammonium fluoride
- Except where otherwise noted, data are given for materials in their standard state (at 25 °C [77 °F], 100 kPa). verify (what is ?) Infobox references

Ammonium bifluoride is an inorganic compound with the formula [NH_{4}][HF_{2}] or [NH_{4}]F·HF. In solid form, it is a white, crystalline salt. It is typically produced from ammonia and hydrogen fluoride.

Ammonium bifluoride is toxic and corrosive. In industry, it etches glass and has been considered as a chemical intermediate for hydrofluoric acid production.

== Structure ==
Ammonium bifluoride, as its name indicates, contains an ammonium cation ([NH_{4}]^{+}), and a bifluoride (or hydrogen difluoride) anion ([HF_{2}]^{−}). The triatomic bifluoride anion features a strong three-center four-electron bond (specifically, a symmetrical hydrogen bond) with a bond energy greater than 155 kJ/mol, and an H-F length of 114 pm.

In solid form ([NH_{4}][HF_{2}]), ammonium bifluoride is similar to other fluoride salts. Its crystal system is orthorhombic, with each cation coordinated with four anions in a tetrahedron (and vice versa). Hydrogen atoms in the ammonium ion form hydrogen bonds with the fluorine atoms, and in the resulting structure, N-H-F are roughly colinear. As a result of these hydrogen bonds, this crystal structure varies from those of other bifluoride salts, such as potassium bifluoride and rubidium bifluoride.

== Production and applications ==
Ammonium bifluoride is a component of some etchants. It attacks the silica component of glass:

SiO_{2} + 4 [NH_{4}][HF_{2}] → SiF_{4} + 4 [NH_{4}]F + 2 H_{2}O

Potassium bifluoride is a related, more commonly used etchant.

Ammonium bifluoride has been considered as an intermediate for the production of hydrofluoric acid from hexafluorosilicic acid. Hexafluorosilicic acid ammonolyzes to give ammonium fluoride, which thermally decomposes to the bifluoride:

H_{2}[SiF_{6}] + 6 NH_{3} + 2 H_{2}O → SiO_{2} + 6 [NH_{4}]F
2 [NH_{4}]F → NH_{3} + [NH_{4}][HF_{2}]

The resulting ammonium bifluoride is converted to sodium bifluoride, which thermally decomposes to release HF.

Ammonium bifluoride is also used as an additive in tin-nickel plating processes as the fluoride ion acts as a complexing agent with the tin, allowing for greater control over the resulting composition and finish.

== Stability and toxicity ==
Ammonium bifluoride crystals are unstable, and decompose rapidly when exposed to air.

Ammonium bifluoride is toxic to consume and a skin corrosion agent. Upon exposure to skin, rinsing with water followed by a treatment of calcium gluconate is required. In water, ammonium bifluoride exists in chemical equilibrium with hydrofluoric acid and heating releases hydrogen fluoride gas. Consequently, there is an equivalent toxicological risk as is present with hydrofluoric acid, and the same safety precautions apply.

Ammonium bifluoride is used in some automotive wheel cleaning products. Ammonium bifluoride products are often considered a safer alternative to hydrofluoric acid, yet still pose clear risks to the handler. Many users unaware of the danger have experienced injuries. Professional Car Washing and Detailing magazine considers ammonium bifluoride, ammonium fluoride, and hydrofluoric acid all "too dangerous for any use in a car wash environment," and a 2015 report from the U.S. Centers for Disease Control and Prevention concurs.
