= Molecular self-assembly =

Movement of molecules into a defined arrangement without outside influence

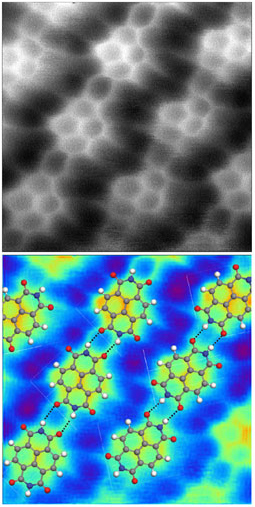
AFM image of napthalenetetracarboxylic diimide molecules on silver interacting via hydrogen bonding at 77 K. ("Hydrogen bonds" in the top image are exaggerated by artifacts of the imaging technique.)

NC-AFM imaging of the molecular self-assembly process of 2-aminoterephthalic acid molecules on calcite(104).

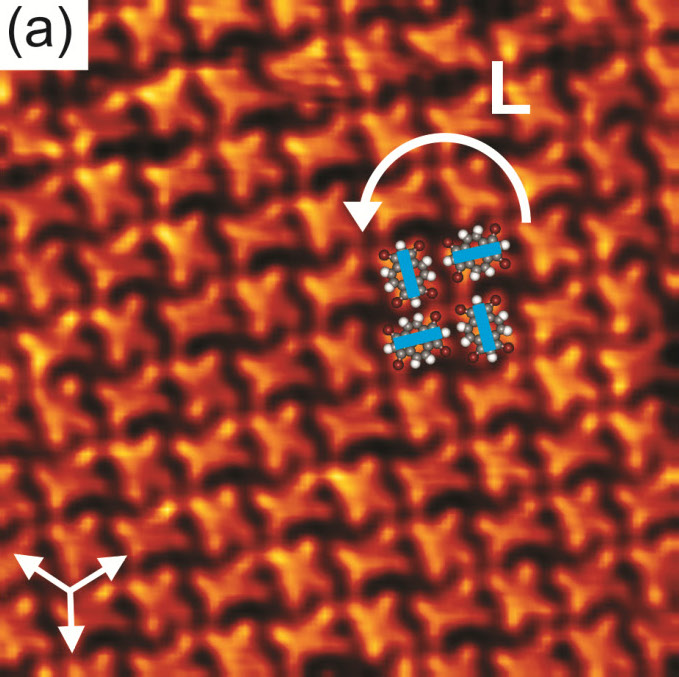

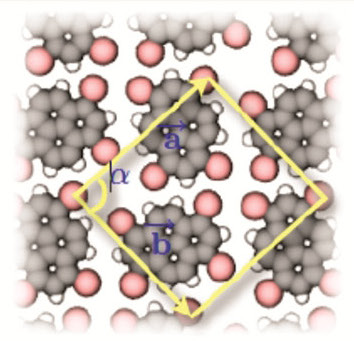
STM image of self-assembled Br_{4}-pyrene molecules on Au(111) surface (top) and its model (bottom; pink spheres are Br atoms).

In chemistry and materials science, molecular self-assembly is the process by which molecules adopt a defined arrangement without guidance or management from an outside source. There are two types of self-assembly: intermolecular and intramolecular. Commonly, the term molecular self-assembly refers to the former, while the latter is more commonly called folding.

== Supramolecular systems ==
Molecular self-assembly is a key concept in supramolecular chemistry. This is because assembly of molecules in such systems is directed through non-covalent interactions (e.g., hydrogen bonding, metal coordination, hydrophobic forces, van der Waals forces, pi-stacking interactions, and/or electrostatic) as well as electromagnetic interactions. Common examples include the formation of colloids, biomolecular condensates, micelles, vesicles, liquid crystal phases, and Langmuir monolayers by surfactant molecules. Further examples of supramolecular assemblies demonstrate that a variety of different shapes and sizes can be obtained using molecular self-assembly.

Molecular self-assembly allows the construction of challenging molecular topologies. One example is Borromean rings, interlocking rings wherein removal of one ring unlocks each of the other rings. DNA has been used to prepare a molecular analog of Borromean rings. More recently, a similar structure has been prepared using non-biological building blocks.

== Biological systems ==
Molecular self-assembly underlies the construction of biologic macromolecular assemblies and biomolecular condensates in living organisms, and so is crucial to the function of cells. It is exhibited in the self-assembly of lipids to form the membrane, the formation of double helical DNA through hydrogen bonding of the individual strands, and the assembly of proteins to form quaternary structures. Molecular self-assembly of incorrectly folded proteins into insoluble amyloid fibers is responsible for infectious prion-related neurodegenerative diseases. Molecular self-assembly of nanoscale structures plays a role in the growth of the remarkable β-keratin lamellae/setae/spatulae structures used to give geckos the ability to climb walls and adhere to ceilings and rock overhangs.

=== Protein multimers ===
When multiple copies of a polypeptide encoded by a gene self-assemble to form a complex, this protein structure is referred to as a "multimer". Genes that encode multimer-forming polypeptides appear to be common. When a multimer is formed from polypeptides produced by two different mutant alleles of a particular gene, the mixed multimer may exhibit greater functional activity than the unmixed multimers formed by each of the mutants alone. In such a case, the phenomenon is referred to as intragenic complementation. Jehle pointed out that, when immersed in a liquid and intermingled with other molecules, charge fluctuation forces favor the association of identical molecules as nearest neighbors.

== Nanotechnology ==
Molecular self-assembly is an important aspect of bottom-up approaches to nanotechnology. Using molecular self-assembly, the final (desired) structure is programmed in the shape and functional groups of the molecules. Self-assembly is referred to as a 'bottom-up' manufacturing technique in contrast to a 'top-down' technique such as lithography where the desired final structure is carved from a larger block of matter. In the speculative vision of molecular nanotechnology, microchips of the future might be made by molecular self-assembly. An advantage to constructing nanostructure using molecular self-assembly for biological materials is that they will degrade back into individual molecules that can be broken down by the body.

=== DNA nanotechnology ===
DNA nanotechnology is an area of current research that uses the bottom-up, self-assembly approach for nanotechnological goals. DNA nanotechnology uses the unique molecular recognition properties of DNA and other nucleic acids to create self-assembling branched DNA complexes with useful properties. DNA is thus used as a structural material rather than as a carrier of biological information, to make structures such as complex 2D and 3D lattices (both tile-based as well as using the "DNA origami" method) and three-dimensional structures in the shapes of polyhedra. These DNA structures have also been used as templates in the assembly of other molecules such as gold nanoparticles and streptavidin proteins.

== Two-dimensional monolayers ==
The spontaneous assembly of a single layer of molecules at interfaces is usually referred to as two-dimensional self-assembly. One of the common examples of such assemblies are Langmuir-Blodgett monolayers and multilayers of surfactants. Non-surface active molecules can assemble into ordered structures as well. Early direct proofs showing that non-surface active molecules can assemble into higher-order architectures at solid interfaces came with the development of scanning tunneling microscopy and shortly thereafter. Eventually two strategies became popular for the self-assembly of 2D architectures, namely self-assembly following ultra-high-vacuum deposition and annealing and self-assembly at the solid-liquid interface. The design of molecules and conditions leading to the formation of highly-crystalline architectures is considered today a form of 2D crystal engineering at the nanoscopic scale.

== See also ==
- Assembly theory
- Foldamer
- Ice-nine
- Macromolecular assembly
- Self-assembly of nanoparticles
- Supramolecular assembly
