= HF2 =

HF2 may refer to:

- Factor H, a glycoprotein.
- Bifluoride, chemical formula [HF_{2}]^{−}.
- Housefull 2, a 2012 Bollywood film featuring an ensemble cast.
- Henry Ford II - (initials include HF2) former CEO of Ford Motor Company, grandson of company founder with the same name.
