= Potassium bifluoride =

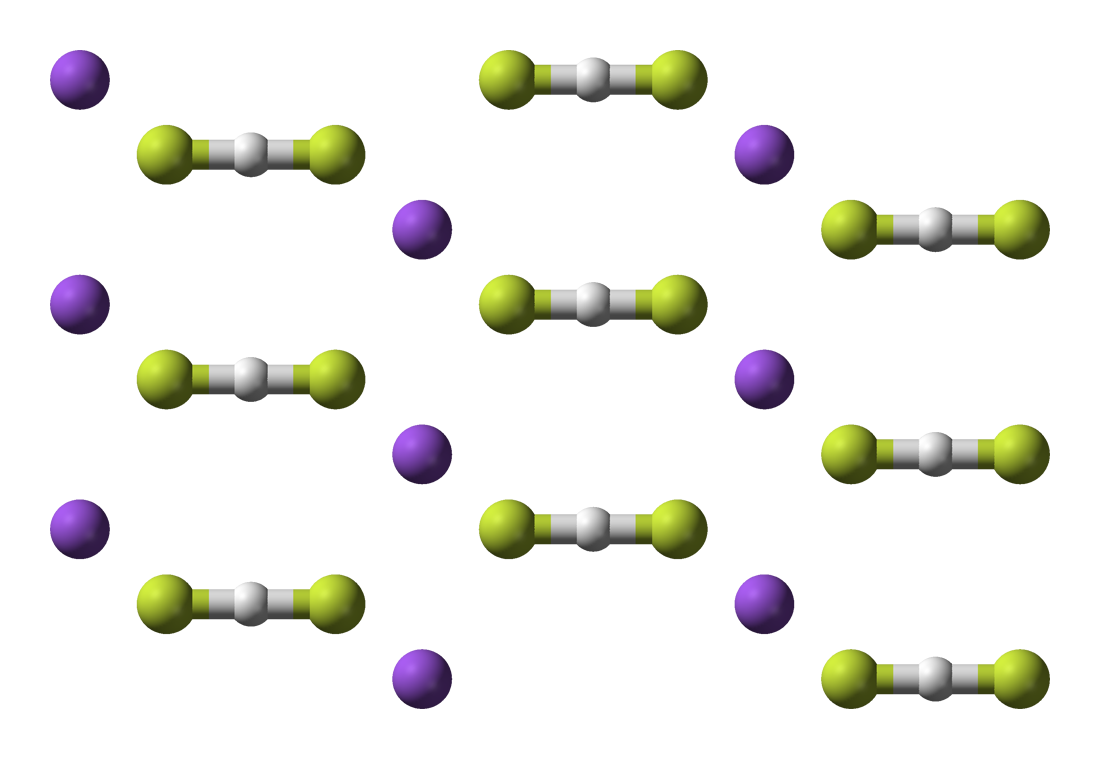

Names
- IUPAC name Potassium bifluoride
- Other names Potassium hydrogen difluoride

Identifiers
CAS Number	7789-29-9
3D model (JSmol)	Interactive image
ChemSpider	35308426
ECHA InfoCard	100.029.233
EC Number	232-156-2
PubChem CID	11829350
RTECS number	TS6650000
UNII	880X05W53M
UN number	1811
CompTox Dashboard (EPA)	DTXSID10894159
- InChI: InChI=1S/F2H.K/c1-3-2;/q-1;+1 Key: FLCWRBFUWAZYGV-UHFFFAOYSA-N
- SMILES: [H-](F)F.[K+]

Properties
Chemical formula	K[HF_{2}]
Molar mass	78.103 g/mol
Appearance	colourless solid
Odor	slightly acidic
Density	2.37 g/cm^{3}
Melting point	238.7 °C (461.7 °F; 511.8 K)
Boiling point	decomposes
Solubility in water	24.5 g/(100 mL) (0 °C); 30.1 g/(100 mL) (10 °C); 39.2 g/(100 mL) (20 °C); 114.0 g/(100 mL) (80 °C)
Solubility	soluble in ethanol

Structure
Crystal structure	monoclinic

Thermochemistry
Std molar entropy (S^{⦵}_{298})	45.56 J/(mol·K)
Std enthalpy of formation (Δ_{f}H^{⦵}_{298})	−417.26 kJ/(mol·K)

Hazards
- GHS labelling
Pictograms	(GHS05: Corrosive) (GHS06: Toxic)
Signal word	Danger
Hazard statements	H301, H310, H314
Precautionary statements	P260, P262, P264, P270, P280, P301+P310, P301+P330+P331, P302+P350, P303+P361+P353, P304+P340, P305+P351+P338, P310, P321, P322, P330, P361, P363, P405, P501
Flash point	non flammable

Related compounds
Other anions	Potassium fluoride
Other cations	Sodium bifluoride, ammonium bifluoride
- Except where otherwise noted, data are given for materials in their standard state (at 25 °C [77 °F], 100 kPa). verify (what is ?) Infobox references

Potassium bifluoride is the inorganic compound with the formula K[HF_{2}]. This colourless salt consists of the potassium cation (K^{+}) and the bifluoride anion ([HF_{2}]^{−}). The salt is used as an etchant for glass. Sodium bifluoride is related and is also of commercial use as an etchant as well as in cleaning products.

== Synthesis and reactions ==
The salt was prepared by Edmond Frémy by treating potassium carbonate or potassium hydroxide with hydrofluoric acid:

2 HF + KOH → K[HF_{2}] + H_{2}O

With one more equivalent of HF, K[H_{2}F_{3}] (CAS RN 12178-06-2, m.p. 71.7 °C) is produced:

HF + K[HF_{2}] → K[H_{2}F_{3}]

Thermal decomposition of K[HF_{2}] gives hydrogen fluoride:

K[HF_{2}] → HF + KF

== Applications ==
The industrial production of fluorine entails the electrolysis of molten K[HF_{2}] and K[H_{2}F_{3}]. The electrolysis of K[HF_{2}] was first used by Henri Moissan in 1886.

== See also ==
- Ammonium bifluoride
- Bifluoride anion
