= Organoxenon chemistry =

Study of compounds containing xenon-carbon bonds

Organoxenon chemistry is the study of the properties of organoxenon compounds, which contain carbon to xenon chemical bonds. The first organoxenon compounds were divalent, such as (C_{6}F_{5})_{2}Xe. The first tetravalent organoxenon compound, [C_{6}F_{5}XeF_{2}][BF_{4}], was synthesized in 2004. So far, more than one hundred organoxenon compounds have been researched.

Most of the organoxenon compounds are more unstable than xenon fluorides due to the high polarity. The molecular dipoles of xenon difluoride and xenon tetrafluoride are both 0 D. The early synthesized ones only contain perfluoro groups, but later some other groups were found, e.g. 2,4,6-trifluorophenyl.

== Organoxenon(II) compounds ==
The most common bivalent organoxenon compound is C_{6}F_{5}XeF, which is almost always used as a precursor to other organoxenon compounds. Due to the instability of xenon(II), it is difficult to synthesize organoxenon compounds by using general organic reagents. Organoxenon compounds are frequently prepared from organocadmium species including Cd(Ar_{F})_{2} (where Ar_{F} is a fluorine-containing arene), C_{6}F_{5}SiF_{3}, and C_{6}F_{5}SiMe_{3} (used along with fluoride).

With the use of stronger Lewis acids, such as C_{6}F_{5}BF_{2}, ionic compounds like [RXe][Ar_{F}BF_{3}] can be produced. Alkenyl and alkyl organoxenon compounds are prepared in this way as well, for example, C_{6}F_{5}XeCF=CF_{2} and C_{6}F_{5}XeCF_{3}.

Some typical reactions are listed below:

2 C_{6}F_{5}XeF + Cd(C_{6}F_{5})_{2} → 2 Xe(C_{6}F_{5})_{2} + CdF_{2}↓

C_{6}F_{5}XeF + (CH_{3})_{3}SiCN → C_{6}F_{5}XeCN + (CH_{3})_{3}SiF

2 C_{6}F_{5}XeF + Cd(2,4,6-F_{3}C_{6}H_{2})_{2} → 2 (2,4,6-F_{3}C_{6}H_{2})XeC_{6}F_{5} + CdF_{2}↓

The third reaction also produces (C_{6}F_{5})_{2}Xe, Xe(2,4,6-F_{3}C_{6}H_{2})_{2} and so on.

The precursor C_{6}F_{5}XeF can be prepared by the reaction of trimethyl(pentafluorophenyl)silane (C_{6}F_{5}SiMe_{3}) and xenon difluoride. Adding fluoride to the adduct of C_{6}F_{5}XeF and arsenic pentafluoride is another method.

Arylxenon compounds with fewer fluorine substituents are also known. For instance, (2,6-F_{2}C_{6}H_{3})Xe^{+}BF^{−}_{4} and (4-FC_{6}H_{4})Xe^{+}BF^{−}_{4} have been prepared, and a crystal structure of the former has been obtained, consisting of a formally 1-coordinate xenon with a long, weak contact with a fluorine on the tetrafluoroborate anion.

== Organoxenon(IV) compounds ==
In 2000, Karel Lutar and Boris Žemva et al. produced an ionic compound. They treated xenon tetrafluoride and difluoro(pentafluorophenyl)borane in dichloromethane at −55 °C:

XeF_{4} + C_{6}F_{5}BF_{2} [C_{6}F_{5}XeF_{2}]^{+}BF^{−}_{4}

The compound is an extremely strong fluorinating agent, and it is capable of converting (C_{6}F_{5})_{3}P to (C_{6}F_{5})_{3}PF_{2}, C_{6}F_{5}I to C_{6}F_{5}IF_{2}, and iodine to iodine pentafluoride.
