= Organokrypton chemistry =

Study of the carbon-krypton bond

Organokrypton chemistry describes the synthesis and properties of organokrypton compounds, chemical compounds containing a carbon to krypton chemical bond.

Far fewer such compounds are known than organoxenon compounds. The first organokrypton compound, HKrCCH, was reported in 2003 and made by photolytic insertion of a krypton atom into acetylene. Similar work was then done on diacetylene and cyanoacetylene, producing HKrC_{4}H and HKrC_{3}N. All these were made in matrix isolation and are stable up to 40 K. HKrCCF and HCCKrF have also been experimentally produced in matrix isolation.

Dications generated by dissociative electron ionisation of 2,4,6-trimethylpyridine react with krypton to form the organokrypton cations C_{8}H_{7}NKr^{2+} and C_{8}H_{8}NKr^{2+}. Reaction of acetylene dications with krypton produced HCCKr^{2+}.
