= Perinone =

- trans-Perinone. cis mirrors one half top-to-bottom

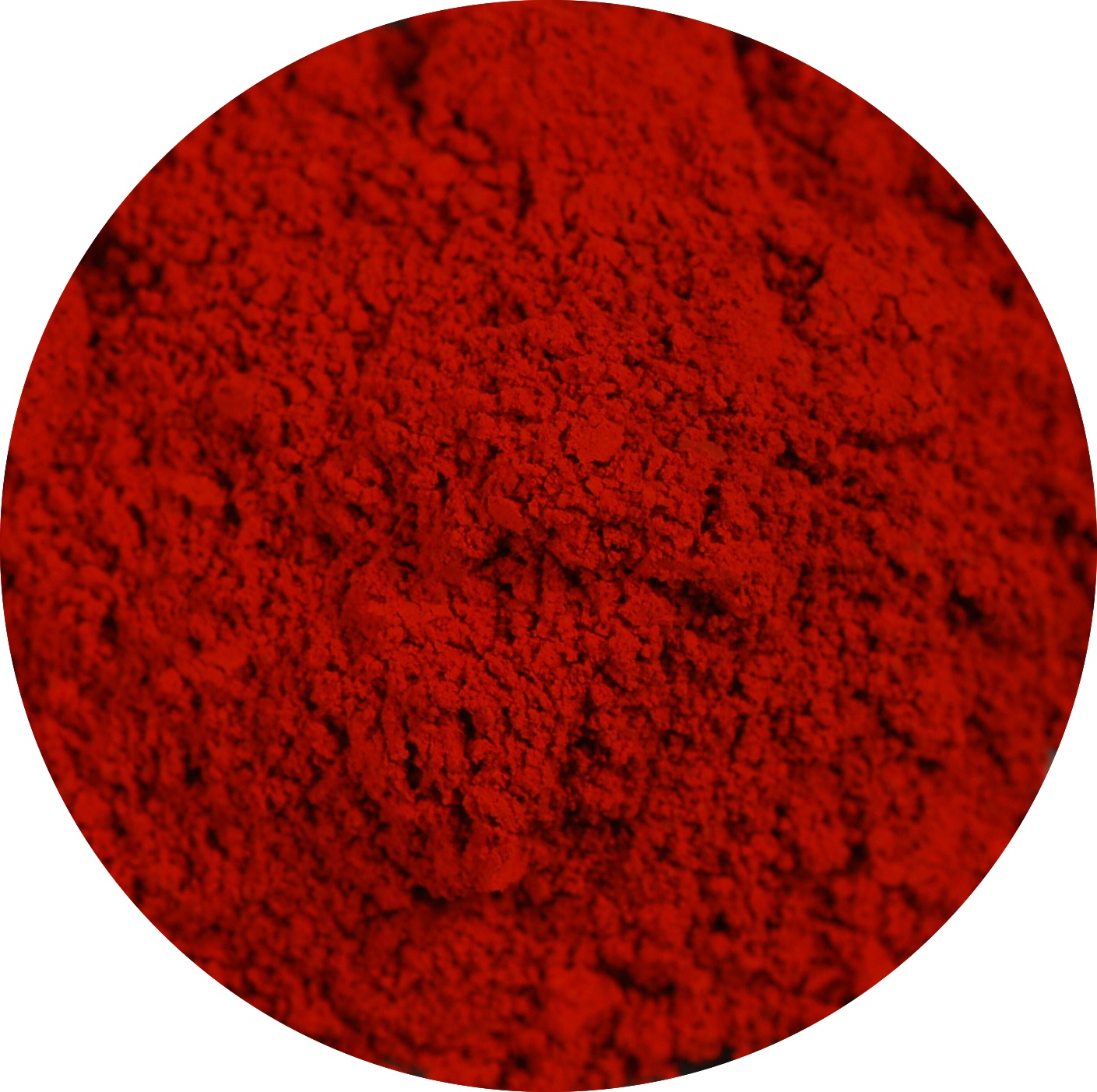

Identifiers
CAS Number	4424-06-0
3D model (JSmol)	trans isomer: Interactive image
ChemSpider	70517
ECHA InfoCard	100.022.363
EC Number	224-597-4
PubChem CID	78141
UNII	NJN999RX4C
CompTox Dashboard (EPA)	DTXSID8025913
- InChI: InChI=1S/C26H12N4O2/c31-25-15-12-10-14-22-16(26(32)30-20-8-4-2-6-18(20)28-24(14)30)11-9-13(21(15)22)23-27-17-5-1-3-7-19(17)29(23)25/h1-12H Key: DGBWPZSGHAXYGK-UHFFFAOYSA-N; InChI=1/C26H12N4O2/c31-25-15-12-10-14-22-16(26(32)30-20-8-4-2-6-18(20)28-24(14)30)11-9-13(21(15)22)23-27-17-5-1-3-7-19(17)29(23)25/h1-12H Key: DGBWPZSGHAXYGK-UHFFFAOYAN
- SMILES: trans isomer: O=c1n2c3ccccc3nc2c4ccc5c(=O)n6c7ccccc7nc6c8c5c4c1cc8

Properties
Chemical formula	C_{26}H_{12}N_{4}O_{2}
Molar mass	412.408 g·mol^{−1}
Appearance	Orange solid
- Except where otherwise noted, data are given for materials in their standard state (at 25 °C [77 °F], 100 kPa). Infobox references

Perinone is a class of organic compounds. The parent compound has two isomers, each of which are useful pigments.

It is prepared from naphthalenetetracarboxylic dianhydride by condensation with o-phenylenediamine. The two Isomers of perinone are useful pigments. The trans isomer is called Pigment Orange 43 ("PO43", CID 78141 from PubChem) and the cis isomer is called Pigment Red 194 ("PR194", CID 77892 from PubChem). Like some structurally related compounds perinone is also an organic semiconductor.

Vat Red 51, an isomer of Vat Orange 7
