= Hydrogen bond =

Intermolecular attraction between a hydrogen donor-and-acceptor pair

Model of hydrogen bonds (1) between molecules of water

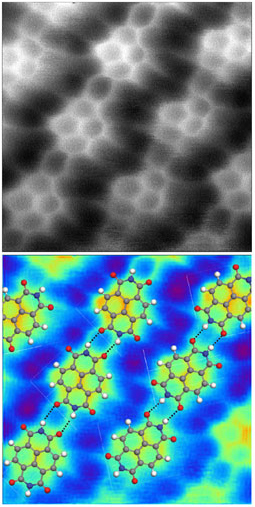
AFM image of naphthalenetetracarboxylic diimide molecules on silver-terminated silicon, interacting via hydrogen bonding, taken at 77 K. ("Hydrogen bonds" in the top image are exaggerated by artifacts of the imaging technique.)

In chemistry, a hydrogen bond (H-bond) is a specific type of molecular interaction that exhibits partial covalent character and cannot be described as a purely electrostatic force. It occurs when a hydrogen (H) atom, covalently bonded to a more electronegative donor atom or group (Dn), interacts with another electronegative atom bearing a lone pair of electrons—the hydrogen bond acceptor (Ac). Unlike simple dipole–dipole interactions, hydrogen bonding arises from charge transfer (nB → σ*AH), orbital interactions, and quantum mechanical delocalization, making it a resonance-assisted interaction rather than a mere electrostatic attraction.

The general notation for hydrogen bonding is Dn−H···Ac, where the solid line represents a polar covalent bond, and the three dots indicate the hydrogen bond. Hydrogen bond donors have a protic hydrogen attached to an electronegative atom such as nitrogen (N), oxygen (O), and fluorine (F). Hydrogen bond acceptors have a lone pair of electrons, such as the nitrogen atom of amines and amides and the oxygen atom of carboxylates and water.

The term "hydrogen bond" is generally used for well-defined, localized interactions with significant charge transfer and orbital overlap, such as those in DNA base pairing or ice. In contrast, "hydrogen-bonding interactions" is a broader term used when the interaction is weaker, more dynamic, or delocalized, such as in liquid water, supramolecular assemblies (e.g.: lipid membranes, protein-protein interactions), or weak C-H···O interactions. This distinction is particularly relevant in structural biology, materials science, and computational chemistry, where hydrogen bonding spans a continuum from weak van der Waals-like interactions to nearly covalent bonding.

Hydrogen bonding can occur between separate molecules (intermolecular) or within different parts of the same molecule (intramolecular). Its strength varies considerably, depending on geometry, environment, and the donor-acceptor pair, typically ranging from 4.2 to 167.4 kJ/mol (1 to 40 kcal/mol). This places hydrogen bonds stronger than van der Waals interactions but generally weaker than covalent or ionic bonds.

Hydrogen bonding plays a fundamental role in chemistry, biology, and materials science. It is responsible for the anomalously high boiling point of water, the stabilization of protein and nucleic acid structures, and key properties of materials like paper, wool, and hydrogels. In biological systems, hydrogen bonds mediate molecular recognition, enzyme catalysis, and DNA replication, while in materials science, they contribute to self-assembly, adhesion, and supramolecular organization.

== Bonding ==
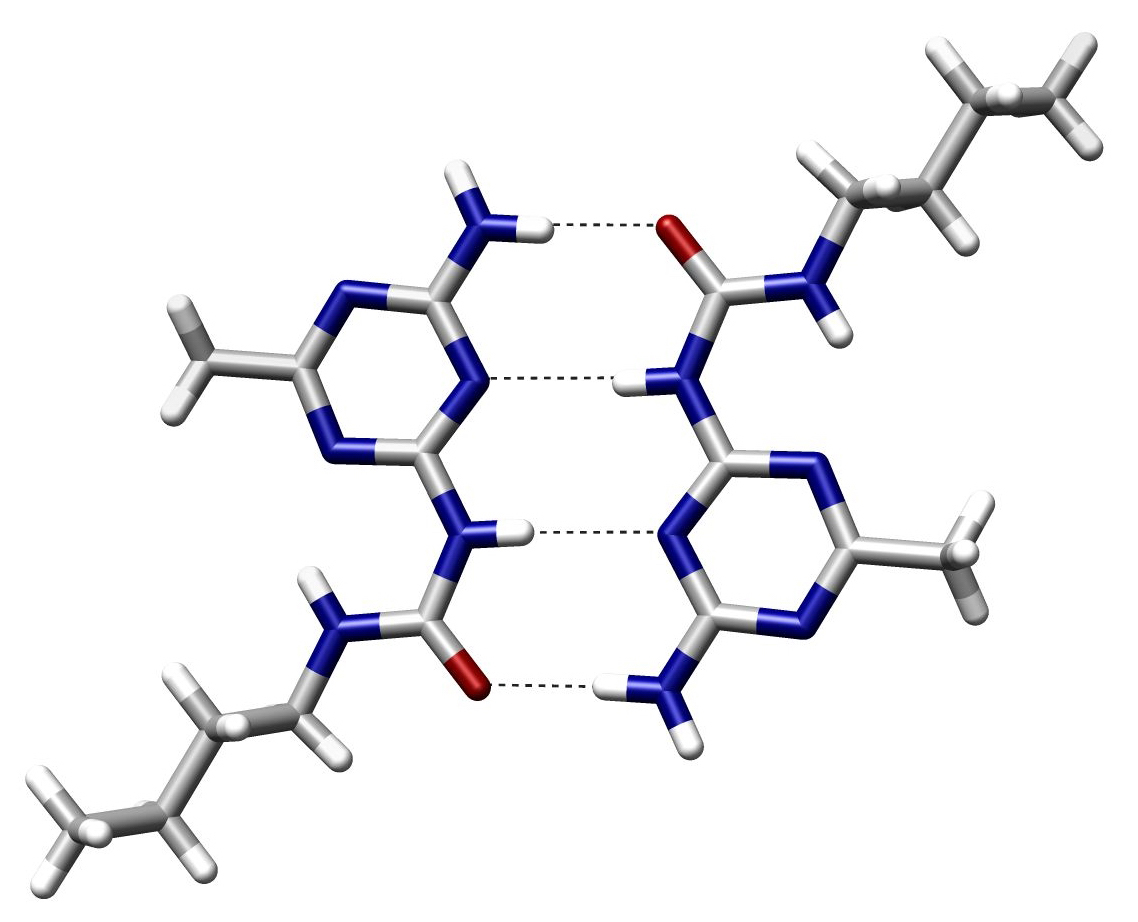
An example of intermolecular hydrogen bonding in a self-assembled dimer complex. The hydrogen bonds are represented by dotted lines.

Intramolecular hydrogen bonding in acetylacetone helps stabilize the enol tautomer.

=== Definitions and general characteristics ===
In a hydrogen bond, the electronegative atom not covalently attached to the hydrogen is named the proton acceptor, whereas the one covalently bound to the hydrogen is named the proton donor. This nomenclature is recommended by the IUPAC. The hydrogen of the donor is protic and therefore can act as a Lewis acid and the acceptor is the Lewis base. Hydrogen bonds are represented as H···Y system, where the dots represent the hydrogen bond. Liquids that display hydrogen bonding (such as water) are called associated liquids.

Examples of hydrogen bond donating (donors) and hydrogen bond accepting groups (acceptors)

Cyclic dimer of acetic acid; dashed green lines represent hydrogen bonds

Hydrogen bonds arise from a combination of electrostatics (multipole-multipole and multipole-induced multipole interactions), covalency (charge transfer by orbital overlap), and dispersion (London forces).

In weaker hydrogen bonds, hydrogen atoms tend to bond to elements such as sulfur (S) or chlorine (Cl); even carbon (C) can serve as a donor, particularly when the carbon or one of its neighbors is electronegative (e.g., in chloroform, aldehydes and terminal acetylenes). Gradually, it was recognized that there are many examples of weaker hydrogen bonding involving donor other than N, O, or F and/or acceptor Ac with electronegativity approaching that of hydrogen (rather than being much more electronegative). Although weak (about 4.2 kJ/mol (1 kcal/mol)), "non-traditional" hydrogen bonding interactions are ubiquitous and influence structures of many kinds of materials.

The definition of hydrogen bonding has gradually broadened over time to include these weaker attractive interactions. In 2011, an IUPAC Task Group recommended a modern evidence-based definition of hydrogen bonding, which was published in the IUPAC journal Pure and Applied Chemistry. This definition specifies:

The hydrogen bond is an attractive interaction between a hydrogen atom from a molecule or a molecular fragment X−H in which X is more electronegative than H, and an atom or a group of atoms in the same or another molecule, in which there is evidence of bond formation.

=== Bond strength ===
Hydrogen bonds can vary in strength from weak (1–2 kJ/mol) to strong (161.5 kJ/mol in the bifluoride ion, HF_{2}^{-}). Typical enthalpies in vapor include:

- F−H···F^{−} (161.5 kJ/mol (38.6 kcal/mol)), illustrated uniquely by HF_{2}^{-}
- O−H···N (29 kJ/mol (6.9 kcal/mol)), illustrated water-ammonia
- O−H···O (21 kJ/mol (5.0 kcal/mol)), illustrated water-water, alcohol-alcohol
- N−H···N (13 kJ/mol (3.1 kcal/mol)), illustrated by ammonia-ammonia
- N−H···O (8 kJ/mol (1.9 kcal/mol)), illustrated water-amide
- OH^{+}_{3}···OH_{2} (18 kJ/mol (4.3 kcal/mol))

The strength of intermolecular hydrogen bonds is most often evaluated by measurements of equilibria between molecules containing donor and/or acceptor units, most often in solution. The strength of intramolecular hydrogen bonds can be studied with equilibria between conformers with and without hydrogen bonds. The most important method for the identification of hydrogen bonds also in complicated molecules is crystallography, sometimes also NMR-spectroscopy. Structural details, in particular distances between donor and acceptor which are smaller than the sum of the van der Waals radii can be taken as indication of the hydrogen bond strength. One scheme gives the following somewhat arbitrary classification: those that are 63 to 167 kJ/mol (15 to 40 kcal/mol), 21 to 63 kJ/mol (5 to 15 kcal/mol), and 0 to 21 kJ/mol (0 to 5 kcal/mol) are considered strong, moderate, and weak, respectively.

Hydrogen bonds involving C−H bonds are both very rare and weak.

=== Resonance assisted hydrogen bond ===
The resonance assisted hydrogen bond (commonly abbreviated as RAHB) is a strong type of hydrogen bond. It is characterized by the π-delocalization that involves the hydrogen atom and cannot be properly described by the electrostatic model alone. This description of the hydrogen bond has been proposed to describe unusually short distances generally observed between O=C−OH··· or ···O=C−C=C−OH.

=== Structural details ===
The X−H distance is typically ≈110 pm, whereas the H···Y distance is ≈160 to 200 pm. The typical length of a hydrogen bond in water is 197 pm. The ideal bond angle depends on the nature of the hydrogen bond donor. The following hydrogen bond angles between a hydrofluoric acid donor and various acceptors have been determined experimentally:

Acceptor···donor	VSEPR geometry	Angle
HCN···HF	C≡N···H angle: linear	180°
H_{2}CO···HF	C=O···H angle: trigonal planar	120°
H_{2}O···HF	H-O···H angle: pyramidal	46°
H_{2}S···HF	H-S···H angle: pyramidal	89°
SO_{2}···HF	S=O···H angle: trigonal	145°

=== Spectroscopy ===
Strong hydrogen bonds are revealed by downfield shifts in the ^{1}H NMR spectrum. For example, the acidic proton in the enol tautomer of acetylacetone appears at $\delta_\text{H}$ 15.5, which is about 10 ppm downfield of a conventional alcohol.

In the IR spectrum, hydrogen bonding shifts the X−H stretching frequency to lower energy (i.e. the vibration frequency decreases). This shift reflects a weakening of the X−H bond. Certain hydrogen bonds - improper hydrogen bonds - show a blue shift of the X−H stretching frequency and a decrease in the bond length. H-bonds can also be measured by IR vibrational mode shifts of the acceptor. The amide I mode of backbone carbonyls in α-helices shifts to lower frequencies when they form H-bonds with side-chain hydroxyl groups. The dynamics of hydrogen bond structures in water can be probed by this OH stretching vibration. In the hydrogen bonding network in protic organic ionic plastic crystals (POIPCs), which are a type of phase change material exhibiting solid-solid phase transitions prior to melting, variable-temperature infrared spectroscopy can reveal the temperature dependence of hydrogen bonds and the dynamics of both the anions and the cations. The sudden weakening of hydrogen bonds during the solid-solid phase transition seems to be coupled with the onset of orientational or rotational disorder of the ions.

=== Theoretical considerations ===
Hydrogen bonding is of persistent theoretical interest. According to a modern description O:H−O integrates both the intermolecular O:H lone pair ":" nonbond and the intramolecular H−O polar-covalent bond associated with O−O repulsive coupling.

Quantum chemical calculations of the relevant interresidue potential constants (compliance constants) revealed large differences between individual H bonds of the same type. For example, the central interresidue N−H···N hydrogen bond between guanine and cytosine is much stronger in comparison to the N−H···N bond between the adenine-thymine pair.

Theoretically, the bond strength of the hydrogen bonds can be assessed using NCI index, non-covalent interactions index, which allows a visualization of these non-covalent interactions, as its name indicates, using the electron density of the system.

Interpretations of the anisotropies in the Compton profile of ordinary ice claim that the hydrogen bond is partly covalent. However, this interpretation was challenged and subsequently clarified.

Most generally, the hydrogen bond can be viewed as a metric-dependent electrostatic scalar field between two or more intermolecular bonds. This is slightly different from the intramolecular bound states of, for example, covalent or ionic bonds. However, hydrogen bonding is generally still a bound state phenomenon, since the interaction energy has a net negative sum. The initial theory of hydrogen bonding proposed by Linus Pauling suggested that the hydrogen bonds had a partial covalent nature. This interpretation remained controversial until NMR techniques demonstrated information transfer between hydrogen-bonded nuclei, a feat that would only be possible if the hydrogen bond contained some covalent character.

== History ==
The concept of hydrogen bonding once was challenging. Linus Pauling credits T. S. Moore and T. F. Winmill with the first mention of the hydrogen bond, in 1912. Moore and Winmill used the hydrogen bond to account for the fact that trimethylammonium hydroxide is a weaker base than tetramethylammonium hydroxide. The description of hydrogen bonding in its better-known setting, water, came some years later, in 1920, from Latimer and Rodebush. In that paper, Latimer and Rodebush cited the work of a fellow scientist at their laboratory, Maurice Loyal Huggins, saying, "Mr. Huggins of this laboratory in some work as yet unpublished, has used the idea of a hydrogen kernel held between two atoms as a theory in regard to certain organic compounds."

== Hydrogen bonds in small molecules ==
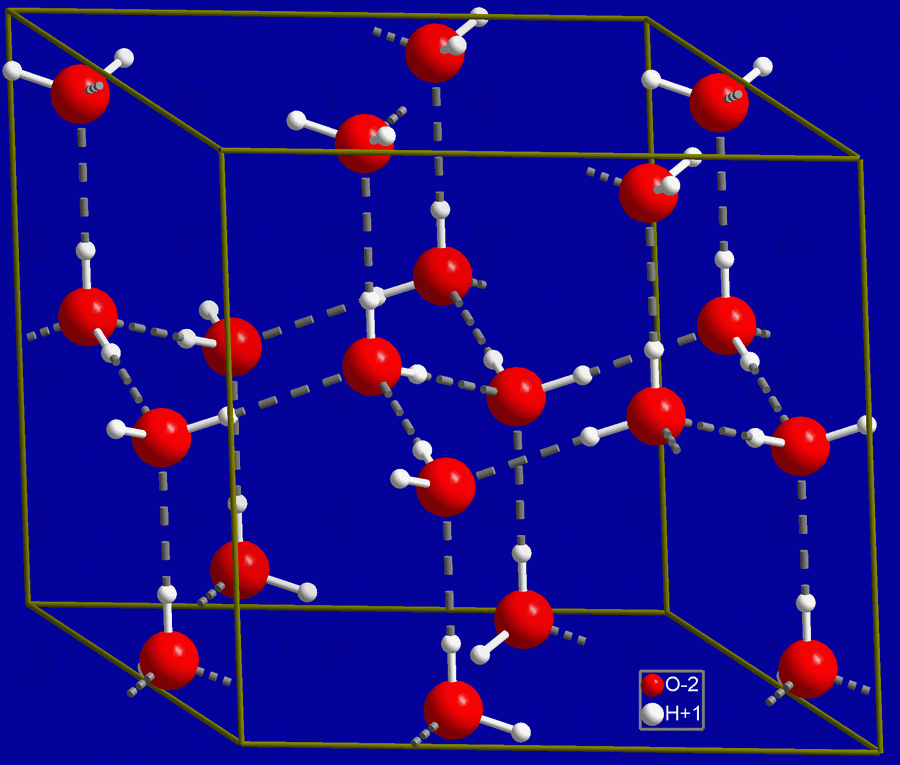
Crystal structure of hexagonal ice. Gray dashed lines indicate hydrogen bonds

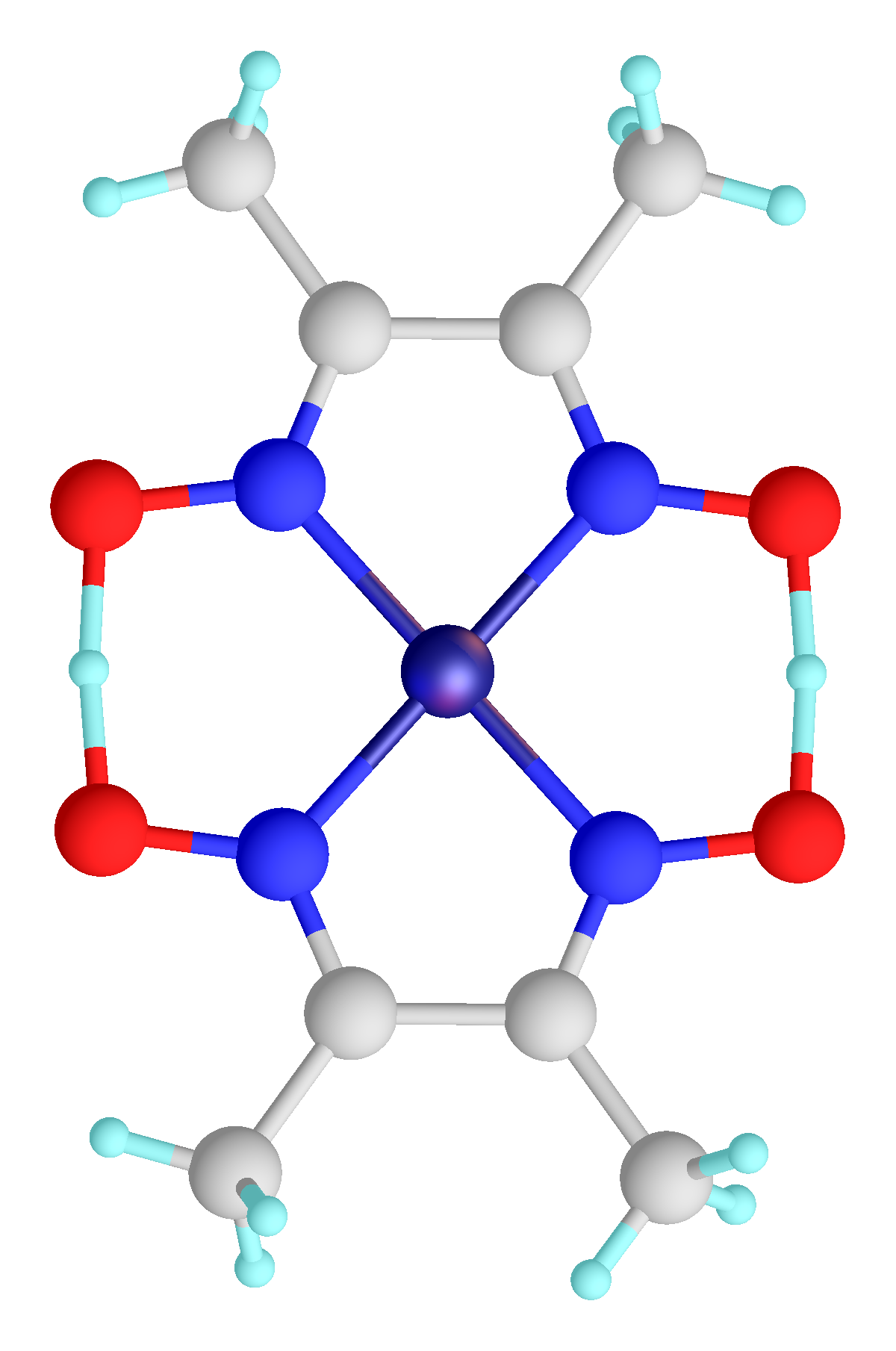
Structure of nickel bis(dimethylglyoximate), which features two linear hydrogen-bonds.

=== Water ===
An ubiquitous example of a hydrogen bond is found between water molecules. In a discrete water molecule, there are two hydrogen atoms and one oxygen atom. The simplest case is a pair of water molecules with one hydrogen bond between them, which is called the water dimer and is often used as a model system. When more molecules are present, as is the case with liquid water, more bonds are possible because the oxygen of one water molecule has two lone pairs of electrons, each of which can form a hydrogen bond with a hydrogen on another water molecule. This can repeat such that every water molecule is H-bonded with up to four other molecules, as shown in the figure (two through its two lone pairs, and two through its two hydrogen atoms). Hydrogen bonding strongly affects the crystal structure of ice, helping to create an open hexagonal lattice. The density of ice is less than the density of water at the same temperature; thus, the solid phase of water floats on the liquid, unlike most other substances.

Liquid water's high boiling point is due to the high number of hydrogen bonds each molecule can form, relative to its low molecular mass. Owing to the difficulty of breaking these bonds, water has a very high boiling point, melting point, and viscosity compared to otherwise similar liquids not conjoined by hydrogen bonds. Water is unique because its oxygen atom has two lone pairs and two hydrogen atoms, meaning that the total number of bonds of a water molecule is up to four.

The number of hydrogen bonds formed by a molecule of liquid water fluctuates with time and temperature. From TIP4P liquid water simulations at 25 °C, it was estimated that each water molecule participates in an average of 3.59 hydrogen bonds. At 100 °C, this number decreases to 3.24 due to the increased molecular motion and decreased density, while at 0 °C, the average number of hydrogen bonds increases to 3.69. Another study found a much smaller number of hydrogen bonds: 2.357 at 25 °C. Defining and counting the hydrogen bonds is not straightforward however.

Because water may form hydrogen bonds with solute proton donors and acceptors, it may competitively inhibit the formation of solute intermolecular or intramolecular hydrogen bonds. Consequently, hydrogen bonds between or within solute molecules dissolved in water are almost always unfavorable relative to hydrogen bonds between water and the donors and acceptors for hydrogen bonds on those solutes. Hydrogen bonds between water molecules have an average lifetime of 10^{−11} seconds, or 10 picoseconds.

=== Bifurcated and over-coordinated hydrogen bonds in water ===
A single hydrogen atom can participate in two hydrogen bonds. This type of bonding is called "bifurcated" (split in two or "two-forked"). It can exist, for instance, in complex organic molecules. It has been suggested that a bifurcated hydrogen atom is an essential step in water reorientation.

Acceptor-type hydrogen bonds (terminating on an oxygen's lone pairs) are more likely to form bifurcation (it is called overcoordinated oxygen, OCO) than are donor-type hydrogen bonds, beginning on the same oxygen atom's hydrogen atoms.

=== Other liquids ===
For example, hydrogen fluoride—which has three lone pairs on the F atom but only one H atom—can form only two bonds. Ammonia has the opposite problem: three hydrogen atoms but only one lone pair.

$$\ce{H-F***H-F***H-F}$$

=== Further manifestations of solvent hydrogen bonding ===
- Increase in the melting point, boiling point, solubility, and viscosity of many compounds can be explained by the concept of hydrogen bonding.
- Negative azeotropy of mixtures of HF and water.
- The fact that ice is less dense than liquid water is due to a crystal structure stabilized by hydrogen bonds.
- Dramatically higher boiling points of NH_{3}, H_{2}O, and HF compared to the heavier analogues PH_{3}, H_{2}S, and HCl, where hydrogen-bonding is absent.
- Viscosity of anhydrous phosphoric acid and of glycerol.
- Dimer formation in carboxylic acids and hexamer formation in hydrogen fluoride, which occur even in the gas phase, resulting in gross deviations from the ideal gas law.
- Pentamer formation of water and alcohols in apolar solvents.

== Hydrogen bonds in polymers ==
Hydrogen bonding plays an important role in determining the three-dimensional structures and the properties adopted by many proteins. Compared to the C−C, C−O, and C−N bonds that comprise most polymers, hydrogen bonds are far weaker, perhaps 5% as strong. Thus, hydrogen bonds can be broken by chemical or mechanical means while retaining the basic structure of the polymer backbone. This hierarchy of bond strengths (covalent bonds being stronger than hydrogen-bonds being stronger than van der Waals forces) is relevant in the properties of many materials.

=== DNA ===
The structure of part of a DNA double helix

Hydrogen bonding between guanine and cytosine, one of two types of base pairs in DNA

In these macromolecules, bonding between parts of the same macromolecule causes it to fold into a specific shape, which helps determine the molecule's physiological or biochemical role. For example, the double helical structure of DNA is due largely to hydrogen bonding between its base pairs (as well as pi stacking interactions), which link one complementary strand to the other and enable replication.

=== Proteins ===
In the secondary structure of proteins, hydrogen bonds form between the backbone oxygens and amide hydrogens. When the spacing of the amino acid residues participating in a hydrogen bond occurs regularly between positions i and i + 4, an alpha helix is formed. When the spacing is less, between positions i and i + 3, then a 3_{10} helix is formed. When two strands are joined by hydrogen bonds involving alternating residues on each participating strand, a beta sheet is formed. Hydrogen bonds also play a part in forming the tertiary structure of protein through interaction of R-groups. (See also protein folding).

Bifurcated H-bond systems are common in alpha-helical transmembrane proteins between the backbone amide C=O of residue i as the H-bond acceptor and two H-bond donors from residue i + 4: the backbone amide N−H and a side-chain hydroxyl or thiol H^{+}. The energy preference of the bifurcated H-bond hydroxyl or thiol system is −14 or 167 kJ/mol (−3.4 or 40 kcal/mol) respectively. This type of bifurcated H-bond provides an intrahelical H-bonding partner for polar side-chains, such as serine, threonine, and cysteine within the hydrophobic membrane environments.

The role of hydrogen bonds in protein folding has also been linked to osmolyte-induced protein stabilization. Protective osmolytes, such as trehalose and sorbitol, shift the protein folding equilibrium toward the folded state, in a concentration dependent manner. While the prevalent explanation for osmolyte action relies on excluded volume effects that are entropic in nature, circular dichroism (CD) experiments have shown osmolyte to act through an enthalpic effect. The molecular mechanism for their role in protein stabilization is still not well established, though several mechanisms have been proposed. Computer molecular dynamics simulations suggest that osmolytes stabilize proteins by modifying the hydrogen bonds in the protein hydration layer.

Several studies have shown that hydrogen bonds play an important role for the stability between subunits in multimeric proteins. For example, a study of sorbitol dehydrogenase displayed an important hydrogen bonding network which stabilizes the tetrameric quaternary structure within the mammalian sorbitol dehydrogenase protein family.

A protein backbone hydrogen bond incompletely shielded from water attack is a dehydron. Dehydrons promote the removal of water through proteins or ligand binding. The exogenous dehydration enhances the electrostatic interaction between the amide and carbonyl groups by de-shielding their partial charges. Furthermore, the dehydration stabilizes the hydrogen bond by destabilizing the nonbonded state consisting of dehydrated isolated charges.

Wool, being a protein fibre, is held together by hydrogen bonds, causing wool to recoil when stretched. However, washing at high temperatures can permanently break the hydrogen bonds and a garment may permanently lose its shape.

=== Other polymers ===
Para-aramid structure

A strand of cellulose (conformation I_{α}), showing the hydrogen bonds (dashed) within and between cellulose molecules

The properties of many polymers are affected by hydrogen bonds within and/or between the chains. Prominent examples include cellulose and its derived fibers, such as cotton and flax. In nylon, hydrogen bonds between carbonyl and the amide NH effectively link adjacent chains, which gives the material mechanical strength. Hydrogen bonds also affect the aramid fibre, where hydrogen bonds stabilize the linear chains laterally. The chain axes are aligned along the fibre axis, making the fibres extremely stiff and strong. Hydrogen-bond networks make both polymers sensitive to humidity levels in the atmosphere because water molecules can diffuse into the surface and disrupt the network. Some polymers are more sensitive than others. Thus nylons are more sensitive than aramids, and nylon 6 more sensitive than nylon-11.

== Symmetric hydrogen bond ==
A symmetric hydrogen bond is a special type of hydrogen bond in which the proton is spaced exactly halfway between two identical atoms. The strength of the bond to each of those atoms is equal. It is an example of a three-center four-electron bond. This type of bond is much stronger than a "normal" hydrogen bond. The effective bond order is 0.5, so its strength is comparable to a covalent bond. It is seen in ice at high pressure, and also in the solid phase of many anhydrous acids such as hydrofluoric acid and formic acid at high pressure. It is also seen in the bifluoride ion [F···H···F]^{−}. Due to severe steric constraint, the protonated form of Proton Sponge (1,8-bis(dimethylamino)naphthalene) and its derivatives also have symmetric hydrogen bonds ([N···H···N]^{+}), although in the case of protonated Proton Sponge, the assembly is bent.

== Dihydrogen bond ==
The hydrogen bond can be compared with the closely related dihydrogen bond, which is also an intermolecular bonding interaction involving hydrogen atoms. These structures have been known for some time, and well characterized by crystallography; however, an understanding of their relationship to the conventional hydrogen bond, ionic bond, and covalent bond remains unclear. Generally, the hydrogen bond is characterized by a proton acceptor that is a lone pair of electrons in nonmetallic atoms (most notably in the nitrogen, and chalcogen groups). In some cases, these proton acceptors may be pi-bonds or metal complexes. In the dihydrogen bond, however, a metal hydride serves as a proton acceptor, thus forming a hydrogen-hydrogen interaction. Neutron diffraction has shown that the molecular geometry of these complexes is similar to hydrogen bonds, in that the bond length is very adaptable to the metal complex/hydrogen donor system.

== Application to drugs ==
The hydrogen bond is relevant to drug design. According to Lipinski's rule of five the majority of orally active drugs have no more than five hydrogen bond donors and fewer than ten hydrogen bond acceptors. These interactions exist between nitrogen–hydrogen and oxygen–hydrogen centers. Many drugs do not, however, obey these "rules".
