= Three-center four-electron bond =

Model of chemical bonding in which three atoms share four electrons

The 3-center 4-electron (3c–4e) bond is a model used to explain bonding in certain hypervalent molecules such as tetratomic and hexatomic interhalogen compounds, sulfur tetrafluoride, the xenon fluorides, and the bifluoride ion. It is also known as the Pimentel–Rundle three-center model after the work published by George C. Pimentel in 1951, which built on concepts developed earlier by Robert E. Rundle for electron-deficient bonding. An extended version of this model is used to describe the whole class of hypervalent molecules such as phosphorus pentafluoride and sulfur hexafluoride as well as multi-center π-bonding such as ozone and sulfur trioxide.

There are also molecules such as diborane (B_{2}H_{6}) and dialane (Al_{2}H_{6}), which have three-center two-electron (3c–2e) bonds.

== History ==
While the term "hypervalent" was not introduced in the chemical literature until 1969, Irving Langmuir and G. N. Lewis debated the nature of bonding in hypervalent molecules as early as 1921. While Lewis supported the viewpoint of expanded octet, invoking s-p-d hybridized orbitals and maintaining 2c–2e bonds between neighboring atoms, Langmuir instead opted for maintaining the octet rule, invoking an ionic basis for bonding in hypervalent compounds (see Hypervalent molecule, valence bond theory diagrams for PF_{5} and SF_{6}).

In a 1951 seminal paper, Pimentel rationalized the bonding in hypervalent trihalide ions (X^{−}_{3}, X = F, Br, Cl, I) via a molecular orbital (MO) description, building on the concept of the "half-bond" introduced by Rundle in 1947. In this model, two of the four electrons occupy an all in-phase bonding MO, while the other two occupy a non-bonding MO, leading to an overall bond order of 0.5 between adjacent atoms (see Molecular orbital description).

More recent theoretical studies on hypervalent molecules support the Langmuir view, confirming that the octet rule serves as a good first approximation to describing bonding in the s- and p-block elements.

== Examples of molecules exhibiting three-center four-electron bonding ==
=== σ 3c–4e ===
- Triiodide
- Xenon difluoride
- Krypton difluoride
- Radon difluoride
- Argon fluorohydride
- Bifluoride
- S_{N}2 reaction transition state and activated complex
- Symmetric hydrogen bond

=== π 3c–4e ===
- Carboxylates
- Amides
- Ozone
- Azide
- Allyl anion

== Structure and bonding ==
=== Molecular orbital description ===
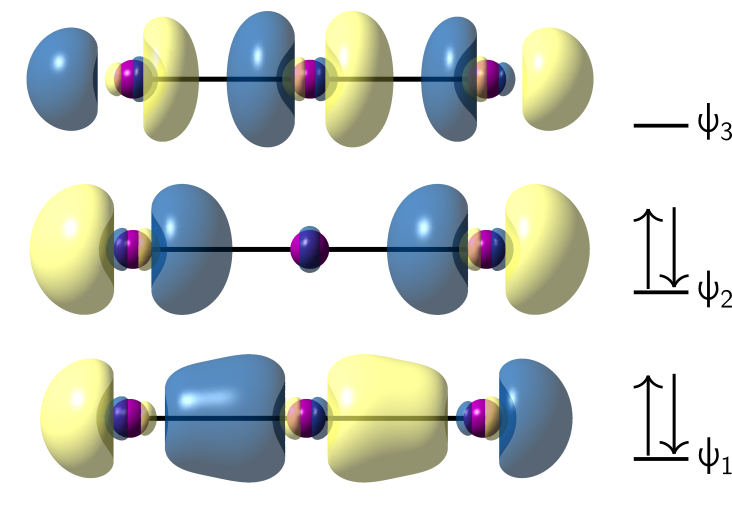
Figure 1: Diagram illustrating σ molecular orbitals of the triiodide anion.

The σ molecular orbitals (MOs) of triiodide can be constructed by considering the in-phase and out-of-phase combinations of the central atom's p orbital (collinear with the bond axis) with the p orbitals of the peripheral atoms. This exercise generates the diagram at right (Figure 1). Three molecular orbitals result from the combination of the three relevant atomic orbitals, with the four electrons occupying the two MOs lowest in energy – a bonding MO delocalized across all three centers, and a non-bonding MO localized on the peripheral centers. Using this model, one sidesteps the need to invoke hypervalent bonding considerations at the central atom, since the bonding orbital effectively consists of two 2-center-1-electron bonds (which together do not violate the octet rule), and the other two electrons occupy the non-bonding orbital.

=== Valence bond (natural bond orbital) description ===
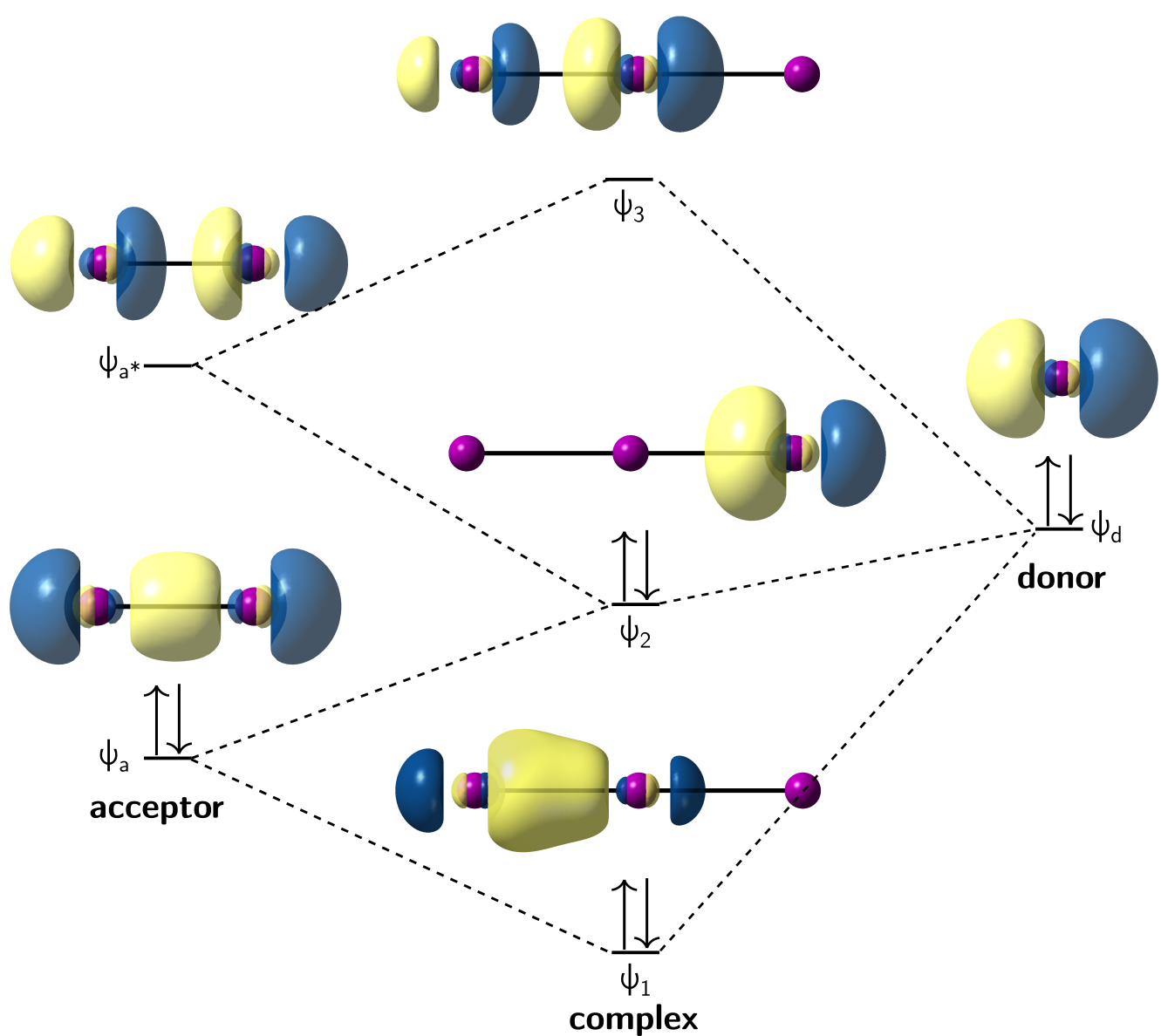
Figure 2: A donor-acceptor interaction diagram illustrating construction of the triiodide anion σ natural bond orbitals from I_{2} and I^{−} fragments.

In the natural bond orbital viewpoint of 3c–4e bonding, the triiodide anion is constructed from the combination of the diiodine (I_{2}) σ molecular orbitals and an iodide (I^{−}) lone pair. The I^{−} lone pair acts as a 2-electron donor, while the I_{2} σ* antibonding orbital acts as a 2-electron acceptor. Combining the donor and acceptor in in-phase and out-of-phase combinations results in the diagram depicted at right (Figure 2). Combining the donor lone pair with the acceptor σ* antibonding orbital results in an overall lowering in energy of the highest-occupied orbital (ψ_{2}). While the diagram depicted in Figure 2 shows the right-hand atom as the donor, an equivalent diagram can be constructed using the left-hand atom as the donor. This bonding scheme is succinctly summarized by the following two resonance structures: I—I···I^{−} ↔ I^{−}···I—I (where "—" represents a single bond and "···" represents a "dummy bond" with formal bond order 0 whose purpose is only to indicate connectivity), which when averaged reproduces the I—I bond order of 0.5 obtained both from natural bond orbital analysis and from molecular orbital theory.

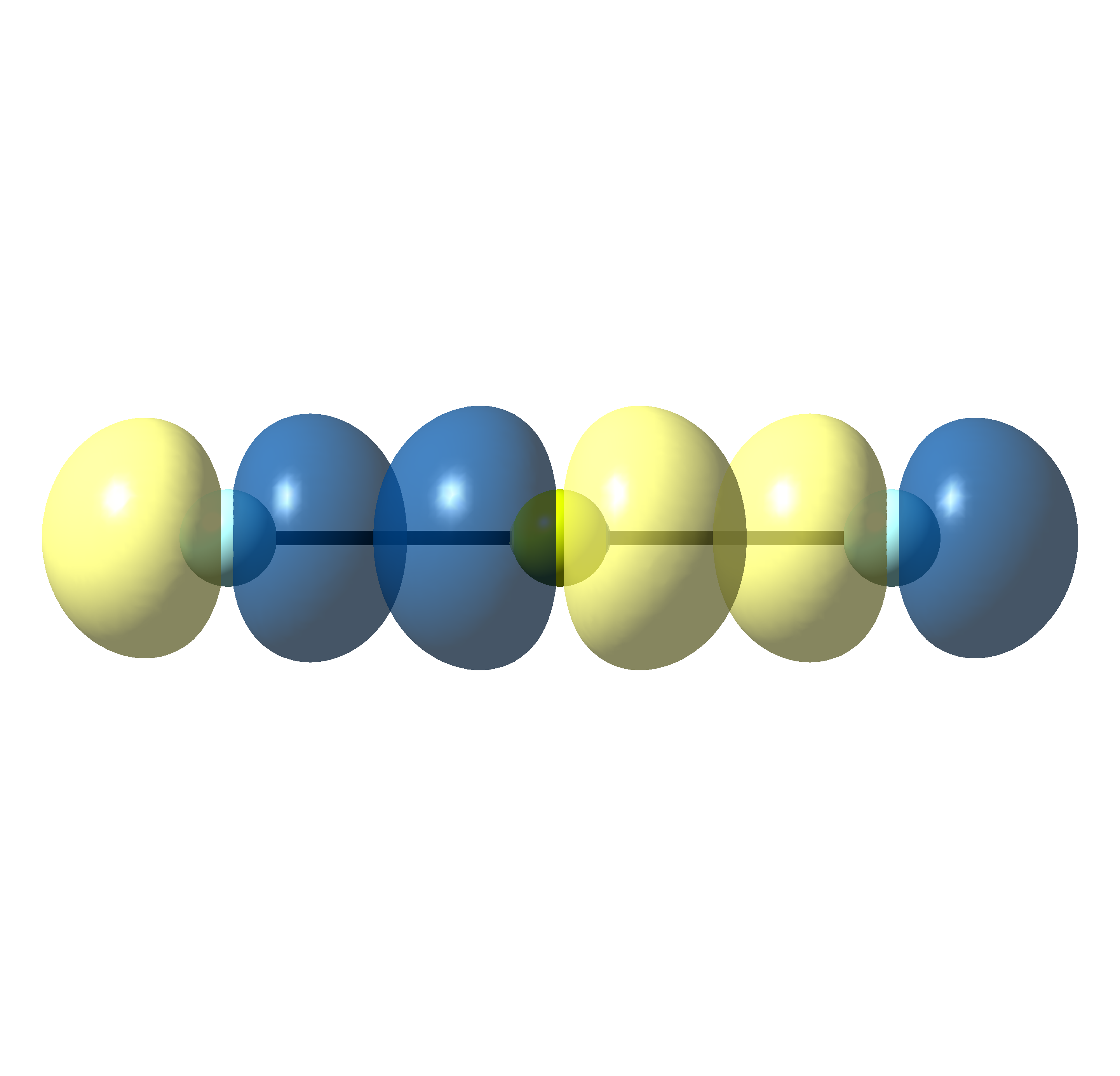
Figure 3: Diagram depicting the natural bond orbital donor-acceptor interaction in neon difluoride. The central Ne atom acts as the donor, while the out-of-phase combination of the peripheral F atoms acts as the acceptor. The two orbitals have been overlaid on the same molecule framework.

More recent theoretical investigations suggest the existence of a novel type of donor-acceptor interaction that may dominate in triatomic species with so-called "inverted electronegativity"; that is, a situation in which the central atom is more electronegative than the peripheral atoms. Molecules of theoretical curiosity such as neon difluoride (NeF_{2}) and beryllium dilithide (BeLi_{2}) represent examples of inverted electronegativity. As a result of unusual bonding situation, the donor lone pair ends up with significant electron density on the central atom, while the acceptor is the "out-of-phase" combination of the p orbitals on the peripheral atoms. This bonding scheme is depicted in Figure 3 for the theoretical noble gas dihalide NeF_{2}.

== S_{N}2 transition state modeling ==
The valence bond description and accompanying resonance structures A—B···C^{−} ↔ A^{−}···B—C suggest that molecules exhibiting 3c–4e bonding can serve as models for studying the transition states of bimolecular nucleophilic substitution reactions.
