= Naphthalenetetracarboxylic dianhydride =

Names
- Preferred IUPAC name Naphtho[1,8-cd:4,5-c′d′]dipyran-1,3,6,8-tetrone
- Other names: 1,4,5,8-Naphthalenetetracarboxylic dianhydride; Naphthalene-1,4,5,8-tetracarboxylic anhydride

Identifiers
CAS Number	81-30-1
3D model (JSmol)	Interactive image
ChemSpider	6426
EC Number	201-342-5
PubChem CID	6678
UNII	L56XQD1V6Y
CompTox Dashboard (EPA)	DTXSID4052554
- InChI: InChI=1S/C14H4O6/c15-11-5-1-2-6-10-8(14(18)20-12(6)16)4-3-7(9(5)10)13(17)19-11/h1-4H Key: YTVNOVQHSGMMOV-UHFFFAOYSA-N
- SMILES: C1=CC2=C3C(=CC=C4C3=C1C(=O)OC4=O)C(=O)OC2=O

Properties
Chemical formula	C_{14}H_{4}O_{6}
Molar mass	268.180 g·mol^{−1}
Appearance	Beige powder
Melting point	> 300 °C (572 °F; 573 K)

Hazards
- GHS labelling
Pictograms	(GHS07: Exclamation mark)
Signal word	Warning
Hazard statements	H315, H319, H335
Precautionary statements	P261, P264, P264+P265, P271, P280, P302+P352, P304+P340, P305+P351+P338, P319, P321, P332+P317, P337+P317, P362+P364, P403+P233, P405, P501
- Except where otherwise noted, data are given for materials in their standard state (at 25 °C [77 °F], 100 kPa). Infobox references

Naphthalenetetracarboxylic dianhydride (NTDA) is an organic compound related to naphthalene. The compound is a beige solid. NTDA is most commonly used as a precursor to naphthalenediimides (NDIs) (such as napthalenetetracarboxylic diimide), a family of compounds with many uses.

== Synthesis and structure ==
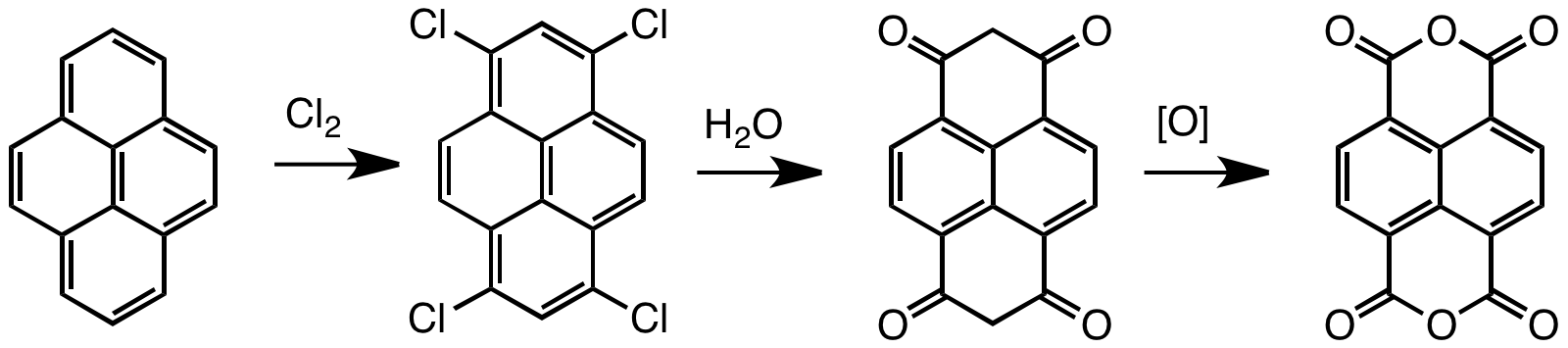
Synthesis of NTDA

Naphthalenetetracarboxylic dianhydride is prepared by oxidation of pyrene. Typical oxidants are chromic acid and chlorine. The unsaturated tetrachloride hydrolyzes to enols that tautomerize to the bis-dione, which in turn can be oxidized to the tetracarboxylic acid.

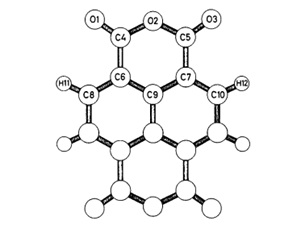
Structure of NTDA. Distances in angstroms: O1 – C4, 1.182; O2 – C4, 1.375; O2 – C5, 1.365; O3 – C5, 1.189; C4 – C6, 1.494; C5 – C7, 1.494.

== Naphthalene diimides ==
Symmetrical naphthalene diimides are synthesized by the condensation reaction of primary amines and the dianhydride. Unsymmetrical derivatives, i.e. those derived from two different amines, are obtained by hydrolysis of one of the two anhydride groups prior to the condensation with the first amine.

These diimides are members of a broader class of compounds called rylenes, oligomers of naphthalene with bonds between the 1 and 1' and 8 and 8' positions. The resulting materials have rigidly planar, highly conjugated cores. They exhibit good processing characteristics for fabrication of soft electronic devices. Aside from the NDIs, other members include the diimide derivatives of perylene-3,4:9,10-tetracarboxylic dianhydride and terrylene-3,4:11,12-tetracarboxylic dianhydride.

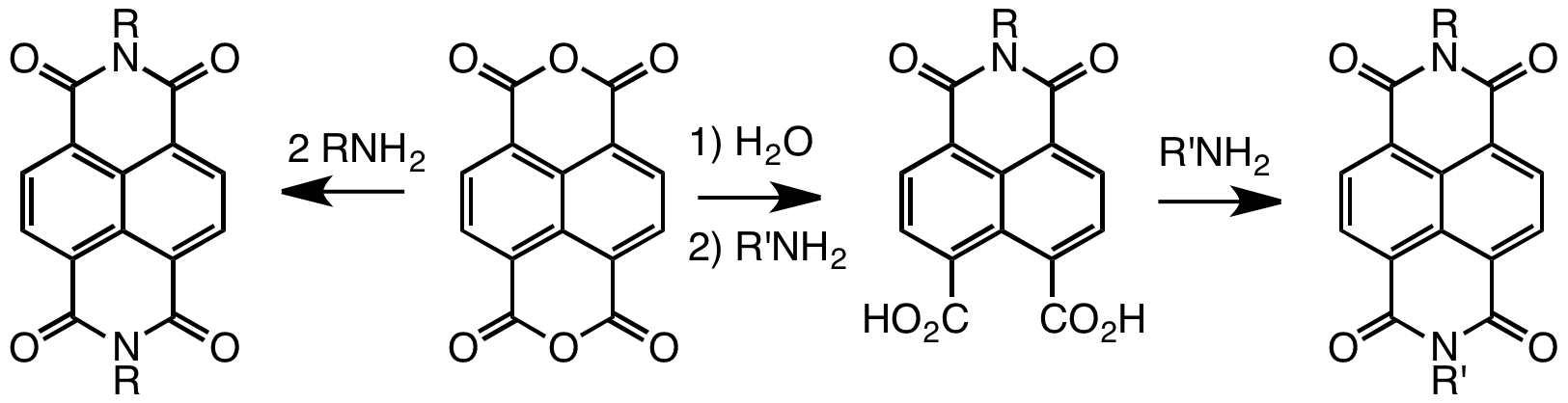
Synthesis of symmetric and unsymmetric NDIs

Naphthalene diimides (NDIs) are often fluorescent, although the intensity is sensitive to substituents. NDIs are also redox-active, forming stable radical anions near -1.10 V vs. Fc/Fc^{+}. Their ability to accept electrons reflects the presence of an extended conjugated ring system and the electron withdrawing groups (carbonyl centers). NDIs are used in supramolecular chemistry due to their tendency to form charge-transfer complexes with crown ethers, e.g. to give rotaxanes and catenanes. As another consequence of their planar structure and electron-acceptor properties, NDIs intercalate into DNA.

A range of amines can be condensed with the dianhydride. For example, two useful pigments of the perinone class are generated by condensation with phenylenediamine. A variety of ligands with NDI backbones have also been prepared.
