= Sodium bifluoride =

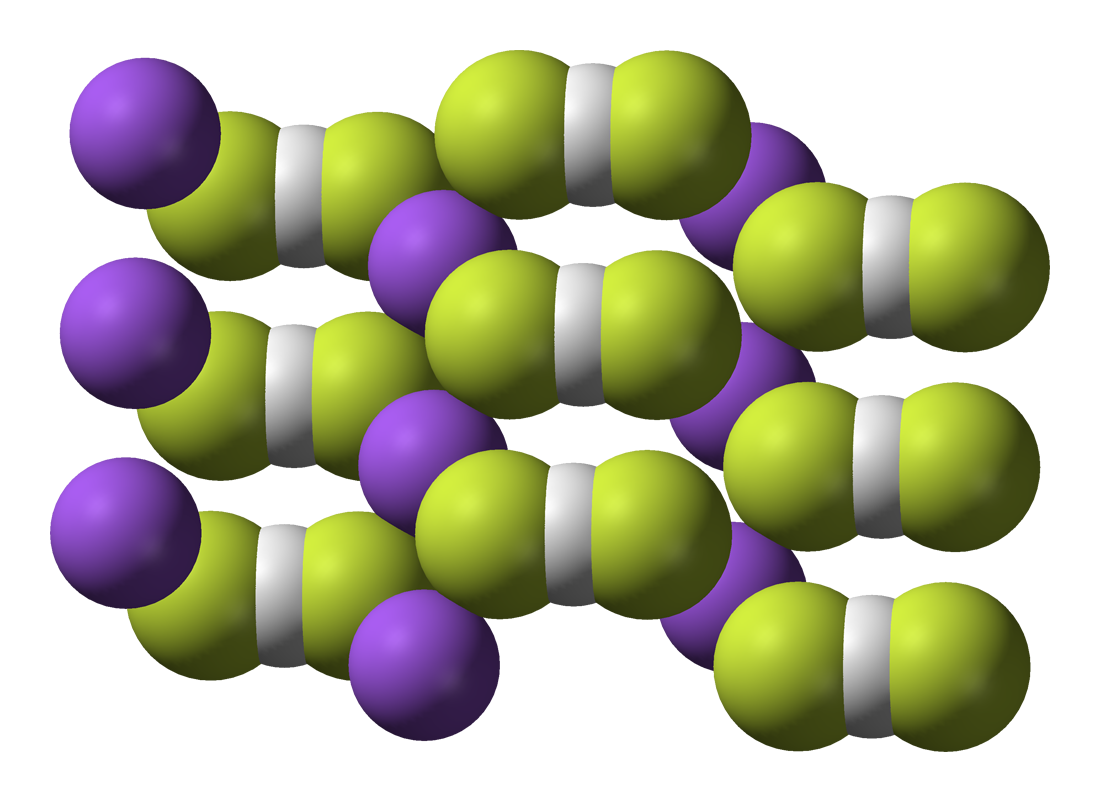

Names
- IUPAC name Sodium bifluoride
- Other names: Sodium hydrogen fluoride; SBF; Sodium acid fluoride

Identifiers
CAS Number	1333-83-1
3D model (JSmol)	Interactive image
ChemSpider	35308427
ECHA InfoCard	100.014.190
EC Number	215-608-3
PubChem CID	219061
UNII	3W2KK83V5G
UN number	2439
CompTox Dashboard (EPA)	DTXSID1037010
- InChI: InChI=1S/F2H.Na/c1-3-2;/q-1;+1 Key: WKYQUTKZJQOMHI-UHFFFAOYSA-N
- SMILES: [H-](F)F.[Na+]

Properties
Chemical formula	Na[HF_{2}]
Molar mass	61.995 g·mol^{−1}
Appearance	white solid
Density	2.08 g/cm^{3}
Melting point	160 °C (320 °F; 433 K) (decomposes)

Hazards
- GHS labelling
Pictograms	(GHS05: Corrosive) (GHS06: Toxic)
Signal word	Danger
Hazard statements	H301, H314
Precautionary statements	P260, P264, P270, P280, P301+P310, P301+P330+P331, P303+P361+P353, P304+P340, P305+P351+P338, P310, P321, P330, P363, P405, P501
- Except where otherwise noted, data are given for materials in their standard state (at 25 °C [77 °F], 100 kPa). Infobox references

Sodium bifluoride is the inorganic compound with the formula Na[HF_{2}]. It is a salt of sodium cation (Na^{+}) and bifluoride anion ([HF_{2}]^{−}). It is a white, water-soluble solid that decomposes upon heating. Sodium bifluoride is non-flammable, hygroscopic, and has a pungent smell. Sodium bifluoride has a number of applications in industry.

== Reactions ==
Sodium bifluoride dissociates to hydrofluoric acid and sodium fluoride:

Na[HF_{2}] ⇌ HF + NaF

The reverse of this reaction is employed to remove HF from elemental fluorine (F_{2}) produced by electrolysis. This equilibrium is manifested when the salt is dissolved and when the solid is heated. Characteristic of other bifluorides, it reacts with acids to give HF. Illustrative is its reaction with bisulfate to form sodium sulfate and hydrogen fluoride.

Strong bases deprotonate bifluoride. For example, calcium hydroxide gives calcium fluoride.

== Production ==
Sodium bifluoride is produced by neutralizing waste hydrogen fluoride, which results from the production of superphosphate fertilizers. Typical bases are sodium carbonate and sodium hydroxide. The process occurs in two steps, illustrated with the hydroxide:

HF + NaOH → NaF + H_{2}O
HF + NaF → Na[HF_{2}]

Sodium bifluoride reacts with water or moist skin to produce hydrofluoric acid. It also gives off hydrofluoric acid and hydrogen gas when it is heated to a gaseous state. The chemical can decompose upon contact with strong acids, strong bases, metal, water, or glass. Sodium bifluoride also engages in violent reactions with chromyl chloride, nitric acid, red phosphorus, sodium peroxide, diethyl sulfoxide, and diethylzinc.

== Applications ==
The main role of sodium bifluoride is as a precursor to sodium fluoride, millions of tons of which are produced annually.

=== Cleaning agents and laundry sours ===
The compound also has applications in cleaning, capitalizing on the affinity of fluoride for iron and silicon oxides. For example, formulations of sodium bifluoride are used for cleaning brick, stone, ceramics, and masonry. It is also used to etch glass. Other applications of the compound involve the galvanization of baths and pest control. Sodium bifluoride's biological applications include the preservation of zoological and anatomical samples.

Other applications of sodium bifluoride include as laundry sours.

=== Other uses ===
Sodium bifluoride has a role in the process that is used to plate metal cans.

Sodium bifluoride also aids in the precipitation of calcium ions during the process of nickel electroplating. The compound also aids in increasing the corrosion of resistance of some magnesium alloys.

== Precautions ==
Sodium bifluoride is corrosive and an irritant upon contact with skin and can cause blistering and inflammation. It is extremely dangerous to ingest. If the compound is exposed to the eyes, blindness and corneal damage can result. Ingestion of sodium bifluoride dust can cause burning, coughing, and sneezing, as a result of irritating the gastrointestinal and respiratory tracts. Exposure of the compound to the eyes can cause redness, itching, and watering. In severe cases, exposure to sodium bifluoride can result in death. It can take between 0 and 24 hours for the effects of sodium bifluoride poisoning to be noticeable.

Exposure to sodium bifluoride repeatedly or over a long time can result in fluorosis. Sodium bifluoride is not known to be carcinogenic.

=== Biological and environmental role ===
Sodium bifluoride does not bioaccumulate. It typically only remains in the environment for several days.
