= Dialane =

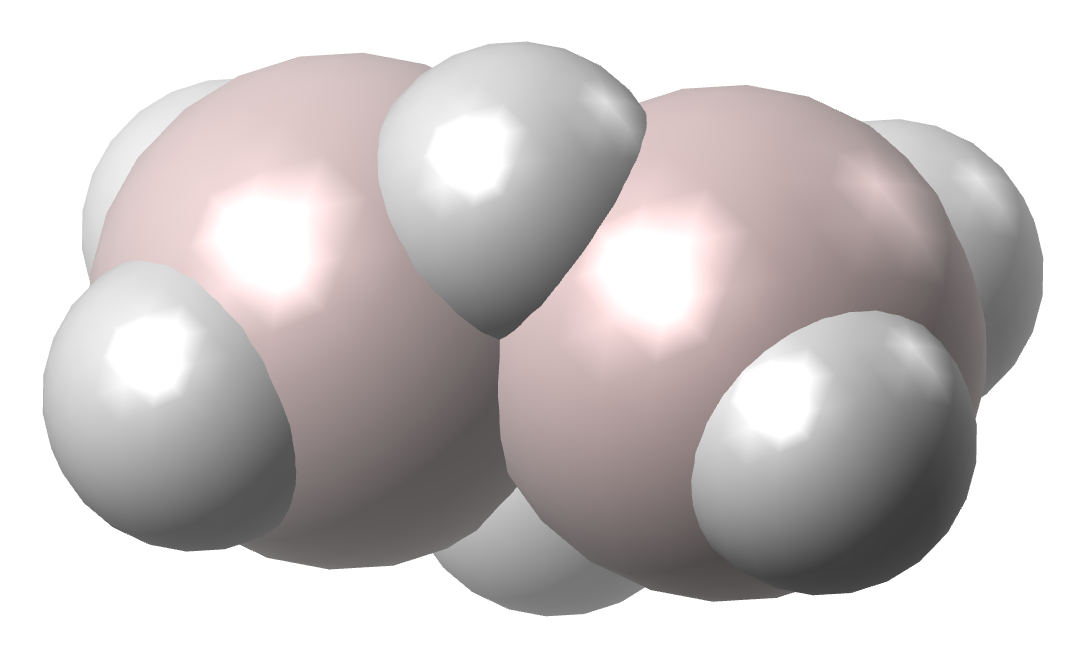

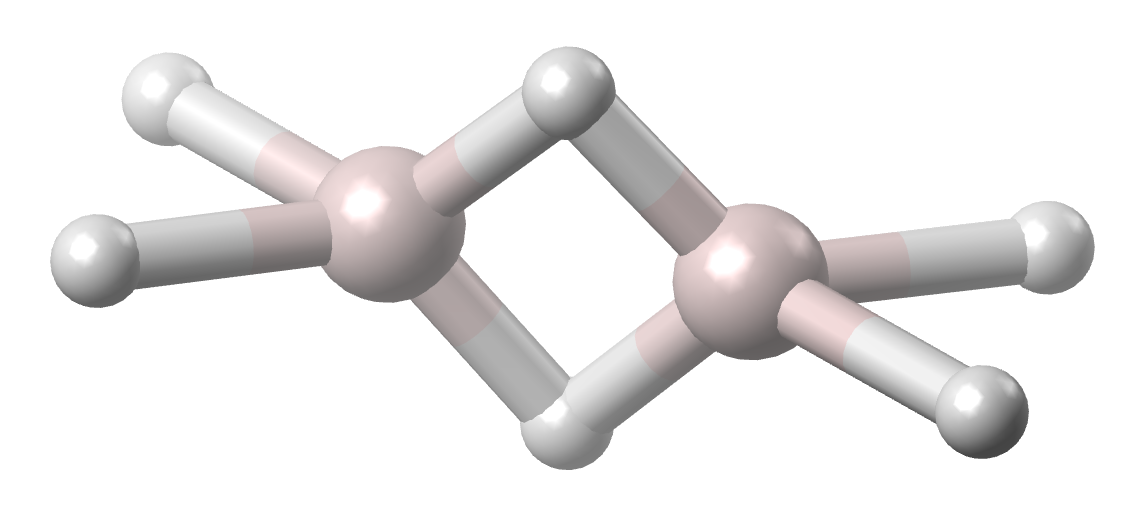

Names
- IUPAC name Dialumane(6)
- Other names Dialumane, dialane

Identifiers
CAS Number	12004-30-7
3D model (JSmol)	Interactive image
- InChI: InChI=1S/Al2H6/c1-3-2-4-1/h1-2H2
- SMILES: [AlH2]1[H][AlH2][H]1

Properties
Chemical formula	Al_{2}H_{6}
Molar mass	60.011 g·mol^{−1}
- Except where otherwise noted, data are given for materials in their standard state (at 25 °C [77 °F], 100 kPa). Infobox references

Dialane is an unstable compound of aluminium and hydrogen with formula Al_{2}H_{6}. Dialane is unstable in that it reacts with itself to form a polymer, aluminium hydride. Isolated molecules can be stabilised and studied in solid hydrogen.
