= Bis(pentafluorophenyl)xenon =

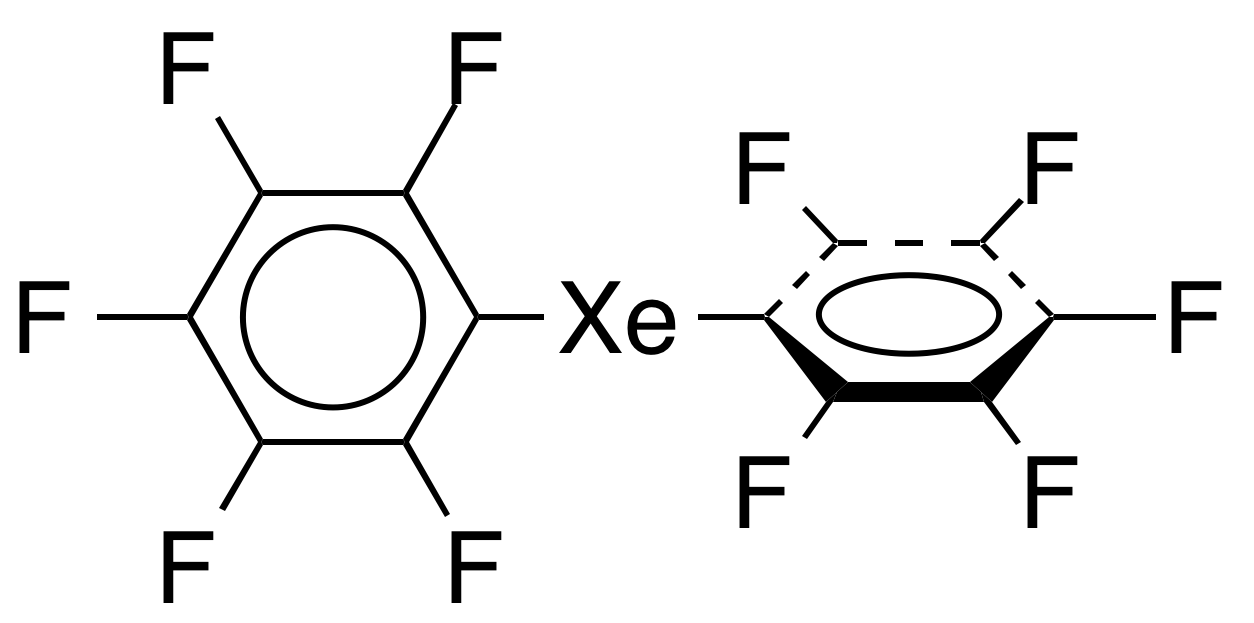

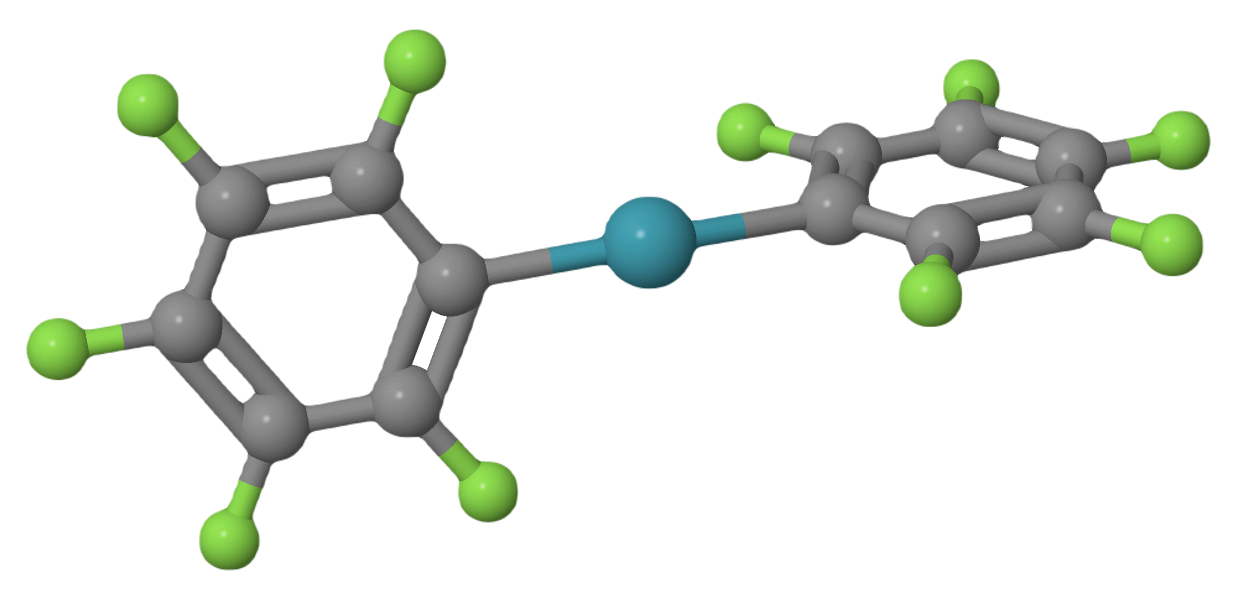

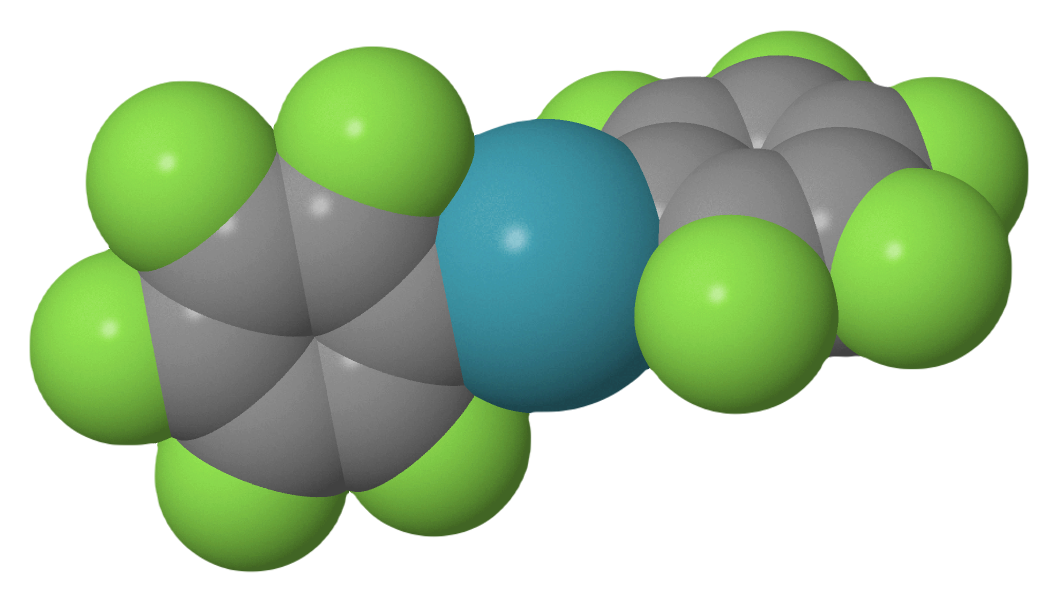

Names
- IUPAC name Bis(2,3,4,5,6-pentafluorophenyl)xenon

Identifiers
CAS Number	328379-54-0
3D model (JSmol)	Interactive image
ChemSpider	21781720
PubChem CID	57397093
CompTox Dashboard (EPA)	DTXSID00725423
- InChI: InChI=1S/C12F10Xe/c13-1-3(15)7(19)11(8(20)4(1)16)23-12-9(21)5(17)2(14)6(18)10(12)22 Key: YAQWCIUPEXZIQW-UHFFFAOYSA-N
- SMILES: C1(=C(C(=C(C(=C1F)F)[Xe]C2=C(C(=C(C(=C2F)F)F)F)F)F)F)F

Properties
Chemical formula	C_{12}F_{10}Xe
Molar mass	465.409 g·mol^{−1}
Density	2.447 g/cm^{3} (at 50 K)
- Except where otherwise noted, data are given for materials in their standard state (at 25 °C [77 °F], 100 kPa). Infobox references

Bis(pentafluorophenyl)xenon is an unstable organic compound of xenon. It consists of two fluorinated phenyl rings connected to xenon.

== Structure ==
Bis(pentafluorophenyl)xenon is a molecular substance. In the solid form it crystallises in the monoclinic system with space group P2_{1}/n. The unit cell has four molecules with a = 13.635 Å. b = 8.248 Å. c = 11.511 Å, β = 102.624°. The unit cell volume is 1263.18 Å^{3}.

The molecules have carbon to xenon to carbon bonds in nearly a straight line (the bond angle is at least 175°). The carbon–xenon bond lengths are 2.35 and 2.39 Å. The two pentafluorophenyl rings are twisted by 72° with respect to each other.

== Properties ==
Bis(pentafluorophenyl)xenon decomposes above −20 °C and can explode.

== Preparation ==
Xe(C_{6}F_{5})_{2} is prepared from the [(CH_{3})_{4}N]F catalyzed reactions of (CH_{3})_{3}SiC_{6}F_{5} and XeF_{2} in propionitrile, propionitrile/acetonitrile, acetonitrile, or CH_{2}Cl_{2} , at −60 to −40 °C as the first [10-Xe-2] species with two xenon-carbon bonds as a colorless solid that decomposes above −20 °C and spontaneously at 20 °C. C_{6}F_{5}XeF is formed as an intermediate which has been characterized by NMR spectroscopy.

XeF_{2} + (CH_{3})_{3}SiC_{6}F_{5} → C_{6}F_{5}XeF + (CH_{3})_{3}SiF

XeF_{2} + 2 (CH_{3})_{3}SiC_{6}F_{5} → Xe(C_{6}F_{5})_{2} + 2 (CH_{3})_{3}SiF

Xe(C_{6}F_{5})_{2} is also formed from the reaction of C_{6}F_{5}XeF with Cd(C_{6}F_{5})_{2}

2 C_{6}F_{5}XeF + Cd(C_{6}F_{5})_{2} → Xe(C_{6}F_{5})_{2} + CdF_{2}

However, the direct introduction of the C_{6}F_{5} group into XeF_{2} with Cd(C_{6}F_{5})_{2} is not successful.

Bis(pentafluorophenyl)xenon is crystallized from dichloromethane at −40 °C.

== Reactions ==
Bis(pentafluorophenyl)xenon reacts with mercury to make bis(pentafluorophenyl)mercury.

Bis(pentafluorophenyl)xenon reacts with hydrogen fluoride to form pentafluorophenyl xenon fluoride C_{6}F_{5}XeF. In acetonitrile solution bis(pentafluorophenyl)xenon decomposes to form C_{6}F_{5}-C_{6}F_{5} (C_{12}F_{10}) and xenon. But in dichloromethane solution the product is mostly pentafluorobenzene.

It reacts with iodine to make pentafluoroiodobenzene (C_{6}F_{5}I).
