= Naphthalenetetracarboxylic diimide =

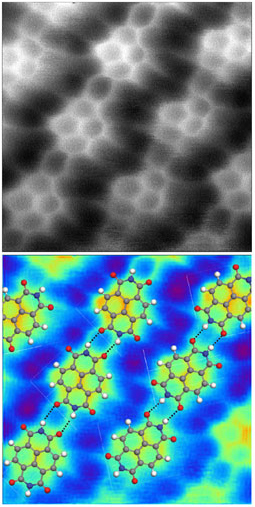
- Top: AFM image of NTCDI molecules on silver interacting via hydrogen bonding (the hydrogen bonds are exaggerated by artifacts of the imaging technique); bottom: model (grey: C, white: H, red: O, blue: N)

Names
- Preferred IUPAC name Benzo[lmn][3,8]phenanthroline-1,3,6,8(2H,7H)-tetrone
- Other names 1,4,5,8-Naphthalenetetracarbondiimide

Identifiers
CAS Number	5690-24-4
3D model (JSmol)	Interactive image
ChemSpider	72067
EC Number	227-159-0
PubChem CID	79771
UNII	896Z6Y4WZP
CompTox Dashboard (EPA)	DTXSID30205440
- InChI: InChI==1S/C14H6N2O4/c17-11-5-1-2-6-10-8(14(20)16-12(6)18)4-3-7(9(5)10)13(19)15-11/h1-4H,(H,15,17,19)(H,16,18,20) Key: BODUWJSFPLUDMP-UHFFFAOYSA-N
- SMILES: c1cc2c3c(ccc4c3c1C(=O)NC4=O)C(=O)NC2=O

Properties
Chemical formula	C_{14}H_{6}N_{2}O_{4}
Molar mass	266.212 g·mol^{−1}
Melting point	> 300 °C
- Except where otherwise noted, data are given for materials in their standard state (at 25 °C [77 °F], 100 kPa). Infobox references

Naphthalenetetracarboxylic diimide (NTCDI) is a solid organic compound and one of the simplest naphthalenediimides (NDIs). NTCDI is produced from the parent naphthalene via an intermediate compound naphthalenetetracarboxylic dianhydride.

== Properties ==
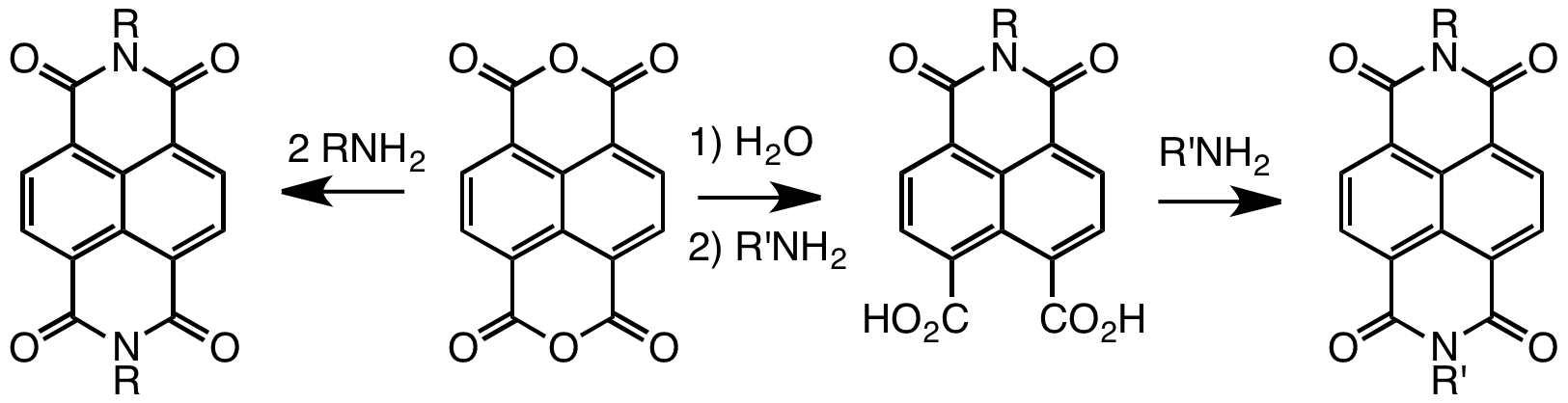
Synthesis of symmetric and unsymmetric NDIs.

NTCDI is redox-active, forming stable radical anions at –1.10 V vs. Fc/Fc^{+} in Dichloromethane. Its ability to accept electrons reflects the presence of an extended conjugated ring system and the electron withdrawing groups (carbonyl centers). NDI is used in supramolecular chemistry owing to its tendency to form charge-transfer complexes with crown ethers, e.g., to give rotaxanes and catenanes. As another consequence of their planar structure and electron-acceptor properties, NDIs intercalate into DNA. It is also suitable for fabrication of soft electronic devices.
