= Xenon fluoride =

Three different xenon fluorides, all exergonic and stable, are known:

- Xenon difluoride, XeF_{2}
- Xenon tetrafluoride, XeF_{4}
- Xenon hexafluoride, XeF_{6}
