= Bifluoride =

Ion with formula HF2 and charge 1-

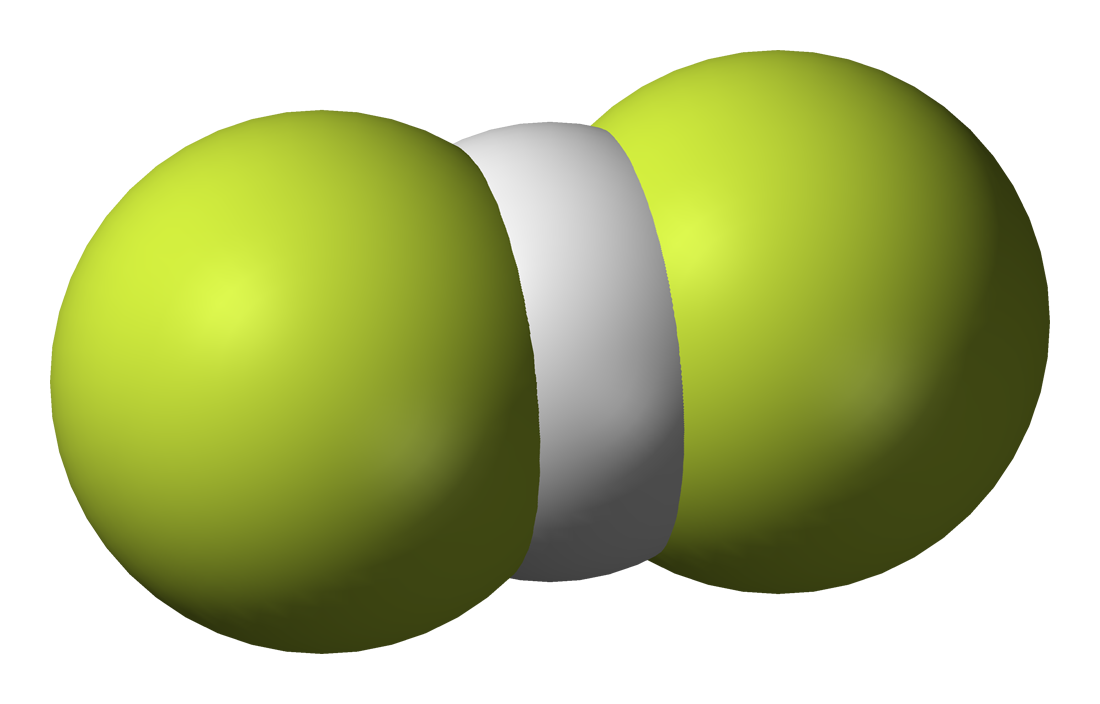

Names
- Other names Hydrogen(difluoride) anion Bifluoride anion Hydrogen difluoride anion

Identifiers
CAS Number	18130-74-0
3D model (JSmol)	Interactive image
ChemSpider	35308425
CompTox Dashboard (EPA)	DTXSID70274195
- InChI: InChI=1S/F2H/c1-3-2/q-1 Key: LJRMFMQHZAVYNS-UHFFFAOYSA-N
- SMILES: F[H][F-]

Properties
Chemical formula	[HF_{2}]^{−}
Molar mass	39.005 g·mol^{−1}
Conjugate acid	Hydrogen fluoride
Conjugate base	Fluoride
- Except where otherwise noted, data are given for materials in their standard state (at 25 °C [77 °F], 100 kPa). verify (what is ?) Infobox references

The bifluoride ion is an inorganic anion with the chemical formula [HF_{2}]^{−}. The anion is colorless. Salts of bifluoride are commonly encountered in the reactions of fluoride salts with hydrofluoric acid. The commercial production of fluorine involves electrolysis of bifluoride salts.

== Structure and bonding ==
The bifluoride ion has a linear, centrosymmetric structure (D_{∞h} symmetry), with an F−H bond length of 114 pm. The bond strength is estimated to be greater than 155 kJ/mol. In molecular orbital theory, the atoms are modeled to be held together by a 3-center 4-electron bond (symmetrical hydrogen bond), in a sort of hybrid between a hydrogen bond and a covalent bond.

== Reactions ==
Salts, such as potassium bifluoride and ammonium bifluoride are produced by treating fluoride salts with hydrofluoric acid:

M^{+}F^{−} + HF → M^{+}[HF_{2}]^{−}, where M^{+} = K^{+} or [NH_{4}]^{+}

Potassium bifluoride binds a second equivalent of HF:

K[HF_{2}] + HF → K[H_{2}F_{3}]

Heating these salts releases anhydrous HF.

The bifluoride anion is present in solutions of HF and buffered oxide etch, used in microfabrication etching. In these processes, bifluoride breaks down silicon oxides, doing more effectively than HF (~4.5 times faster).

SiO_{2} + 3 [HF_{2}]^{−} + H^{+} → [SiF_{6}]^{2−} + 2 H_{2}O
