= FAM83H =

Protein-coding gene in the species Homo sapiens

Identifiers
- Aliases: FAM83H, AI3, family with sequence similarity 83 member H, AI3A
- External IDs: OMIM: 611927; MGI: 2145900; HomoloGene: 15890; GeneCards: FAM83H; OMA:FAM83H - orthologs

Gene location (Human)
| Chr. | Chromosome 8 (human) |
| Band | 8q24.3 | Start | 143,723,933 bp |
| Band | 8q24.3 | End | 143,738,234 bp |

Gene location (Mouse)
| Chr. | Chromosome 15 (mouse) |
| Band | 15|15 D3 | Start | 75,872,942 bp |
| Band | 15|15 D3 | End | 75,886,185 bp |
RNA expression pattern
| Bgee | Human / Mouse (ortholog); Top expressed in: right uterine tube; skin of leg; skin of abdomen; mucosa of transverse colon; olfactory zone of nasal mucosa; right lobe of thyroid gland; left lobe of thyroid gland; minor salivary glands; body of pancreas; right lobe of liver / Top expressed in: lip; corneal stroma; lumbar spinal ganglion; conjunctival fornix; hair follicle; left colon; transitional epithelium of urinary bladder; esophagus; skin of external ear; ileum; More reference expression data |
| BioGPS | n/a |
Gene ontology
| Molecular function | protein kinase binding; keratin filament binding |
| Cellular component | cytoplasm; keratin filament; cytoskeleton |
| Biological process | biomineral tissue development; protein localization to cytoskeleton; intermediate filament cytoskeleton organization; positive regulation of cell migration |
Sources:Amigo / QuickGO
Orthologs
| Species | Human | Mouse |
| Entrez | 286077 | 105732 |
| Ensembl | ENSG00000180921; ENSG00000273889 | ENSMUSG00000046761 |
| UniProt | Q6ZRV2 | Q148V8 |
| RefSeq (mRNA) | NM_198488 | NM_001168253; NM_134087 |
| RefSeq (protein) | NP_940890 | NP_001161725; NP_598848 |
| Location (UCSC) | Chr 8: 143.72 – 143.74 Mb | Chr 15: 75.87 – 75.89 Mb |
| PubMed search |
- Wikidata
| View/Edit Human | View/Edit Mouse |

FAM83H is a protein, which in humans is encoded by the FAM83H gene. The protein is also known as uncharacterized protein FAM83H. FAM83H is targeted for the nucleus. It is predicted to play a role in the structural development and calcification of tooth enamel.

== Gene ==
=== Location ===
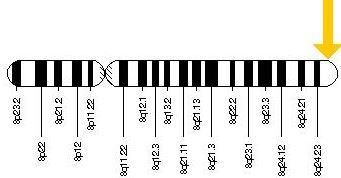
location of FAM83H on chromosome 8

FAM83H is located on the long arm of chromosome 8 (8q24.3), starting at 143723933 and ending at 143738030. The FAM83H gene spans 14097 base pairs and is orientated on the—strand. The coding region is made up of 5,604 base pairs and 5 exons.

=== Expression ===
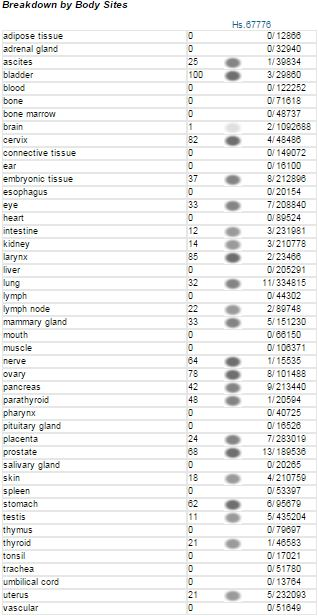
Tissue where FAM83H has been found, as well as concentration

FAM83H is ubiquitously expressed throughout the human body at relatively low levels.

=== Transcript Variants ===
In humans, there is only one known major product of the FAM83H gene.

== Homology ==
=== Paralogs ===
There are no paralogs of FAM83H.

=== Orthologs ===
Below is a table of orthologs to the human FAM83H protein. The table include closely, intermediately and distantly related orthologs.

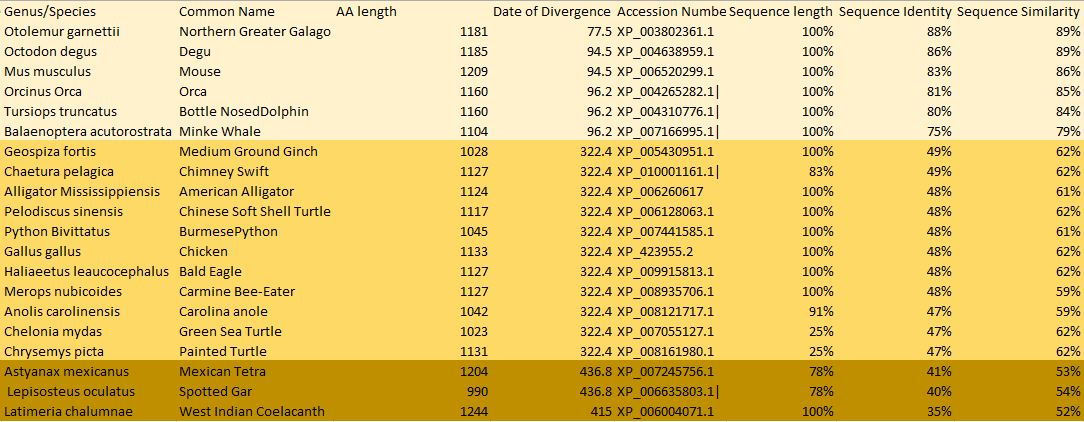
orthologs of the human FAM83H gene

Orthologs of the human protein FAM83H are listed above in descending order or date of divergence and then ascending order of percent identity. FAM83H is highly conserved throughout all orthologs, demonstrated by a 40% identity in the least similar ortholog. FAM83H has evolved slowly and evenly over time.

== Protein ==
=== General Properties ===
The molecular weight of FAM83H is 127.1kD and contains 1179 amino acids. The isoelectric point is 6.52. There are no significant positive or negative charge clusters in the protein. There is a stretch of 21 0’s from 254-275 and a stretch of 24 0’s from 420-444.1

=== Composition ===
FAM83H is proline rich, being 10.32% protein, and is asparagine deficient with only 1.1%. The percent composition of each amino acid is fairly consistent throughout the orthologs of the protein. The most distant ortholog displays the most variance in amino acid composition.

=== Domains ===
FAM83H has two known domains. The PLDc_FAM83H (phospholipase like domain) domain stretches from 17-281 on FAM83H. It lacks the functionally important histidine, so while it may share similar structure it most likely lacks PLD activity. The MIP-T3 microtubule binding domain stretches from 909-1176.

=== Post-translational modifications ===
FAM83H is highly phosphorylated post modification. There are 11 predicted phosphorylated sites. There are two motifs with high probability of post translational modification sumoylation sites. Sumoylation sites are involved in a number of cellular processes, including nuclear-cytosolic transport, transcriptional regulation and protein stability. FAM83H does not have a signal peptide

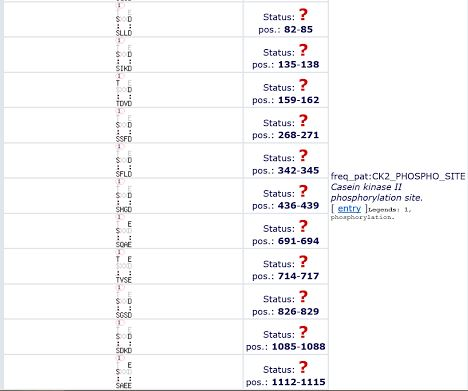
Predicted phosphorylation sites

=== Secondary Structure ===
Fam83H is primarily composed of alpha helices and random coils. Alpha helices comprise the majority of the protein. There is a transmembrane domain from 231-252.

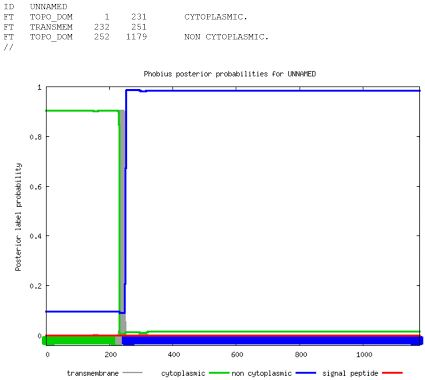
transmembrane domain

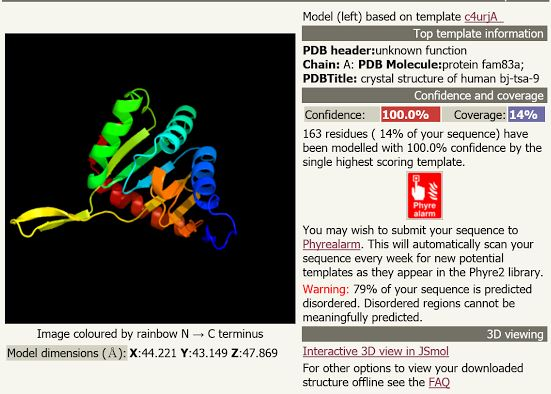
Predicted partial structure of FAM83H

=== Subcellular Localization ===
Protein FAM83H is targeted to the nucleus.

=== Interacting Proteins ===
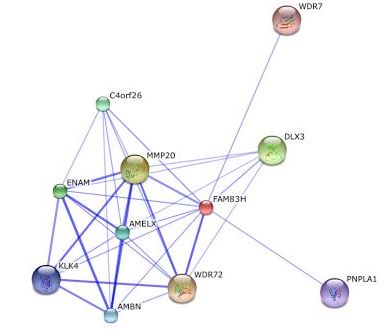
Proteins found to interact with FAM83H. The thicker the line, the stronger the interaction.

FAM83H was found to interact with WDR72 and MMP20. MMP20 is responsible for the breakdown of extracellular matrix and plays a role in tissue remodeling in ameloblasts. mutations in WDR72 is thought to play a role in amelogenesis imperfecta

== Clinical Significance ==
=== Disease Association ===
People who suffer from amelogenesis imperfecta have lost function in FAM83H.
