= Striae of Retzius =

Incremental growth lines or bands seen in tooth enamel

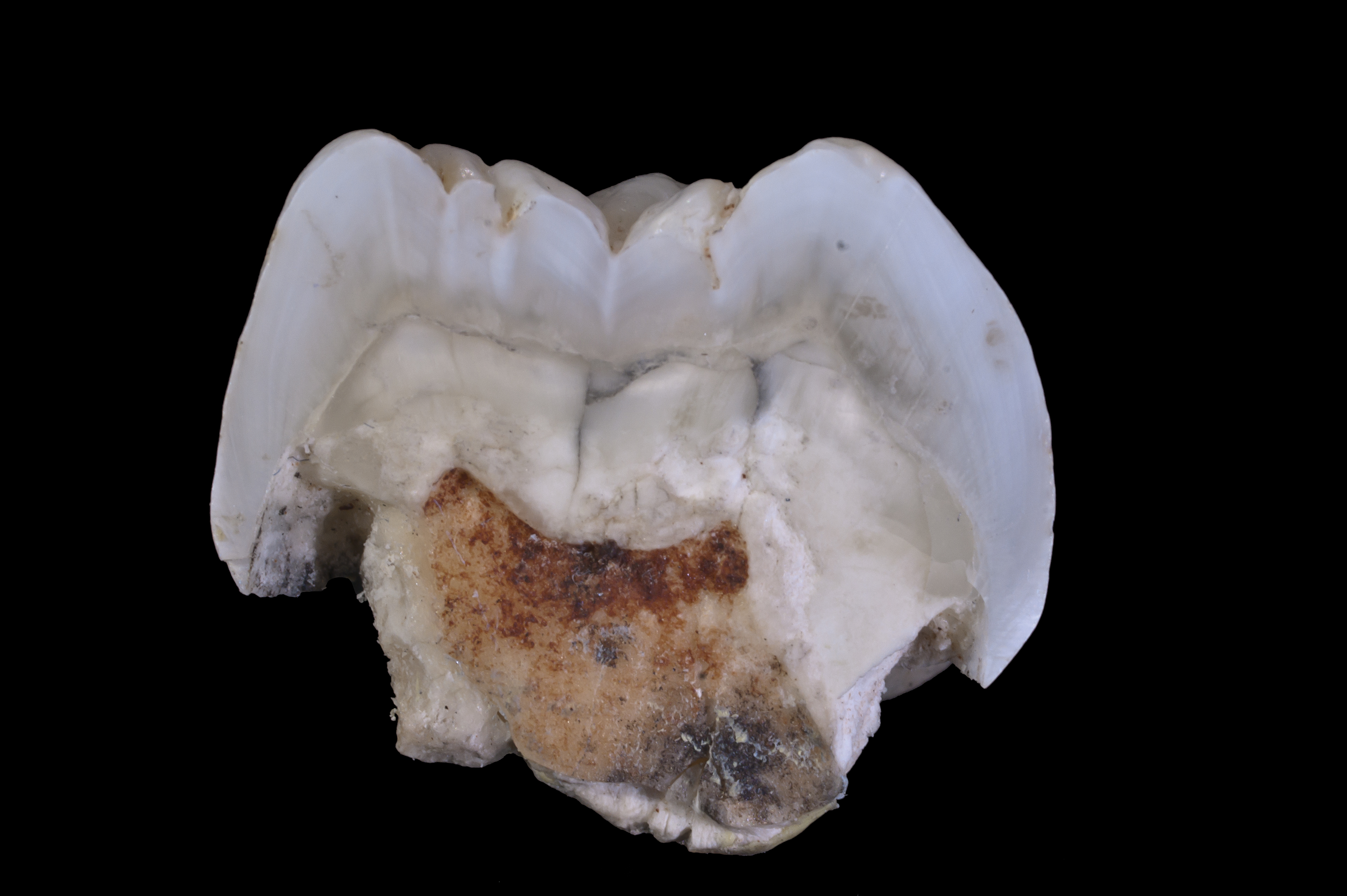
Tooth of a Paranthropus robustus with striae of Retzius visible on the left side

The striae of Retzius are incremental growth lines or bands seen in tooth enamel. They represent the incremental pattern of enamel, the successive apposition of different layers of enamel during crown formation.

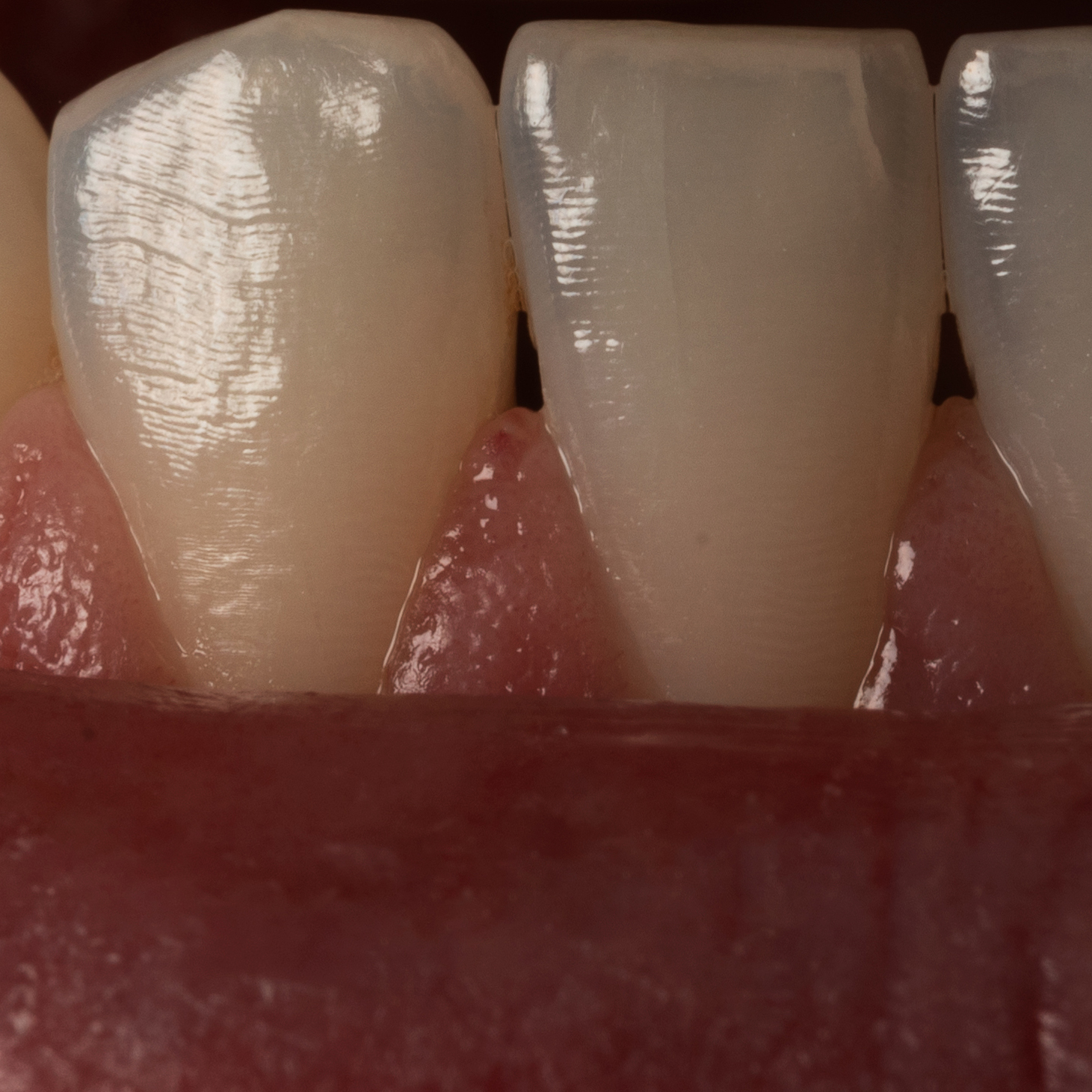
Striae of Retzius visible on the lower incisors of a 26-year-old patient.

There are 3 types of incremental lines: Daily incremental lines (cross striation), striae of Retzius and neonatal lines.

== Appearance ==
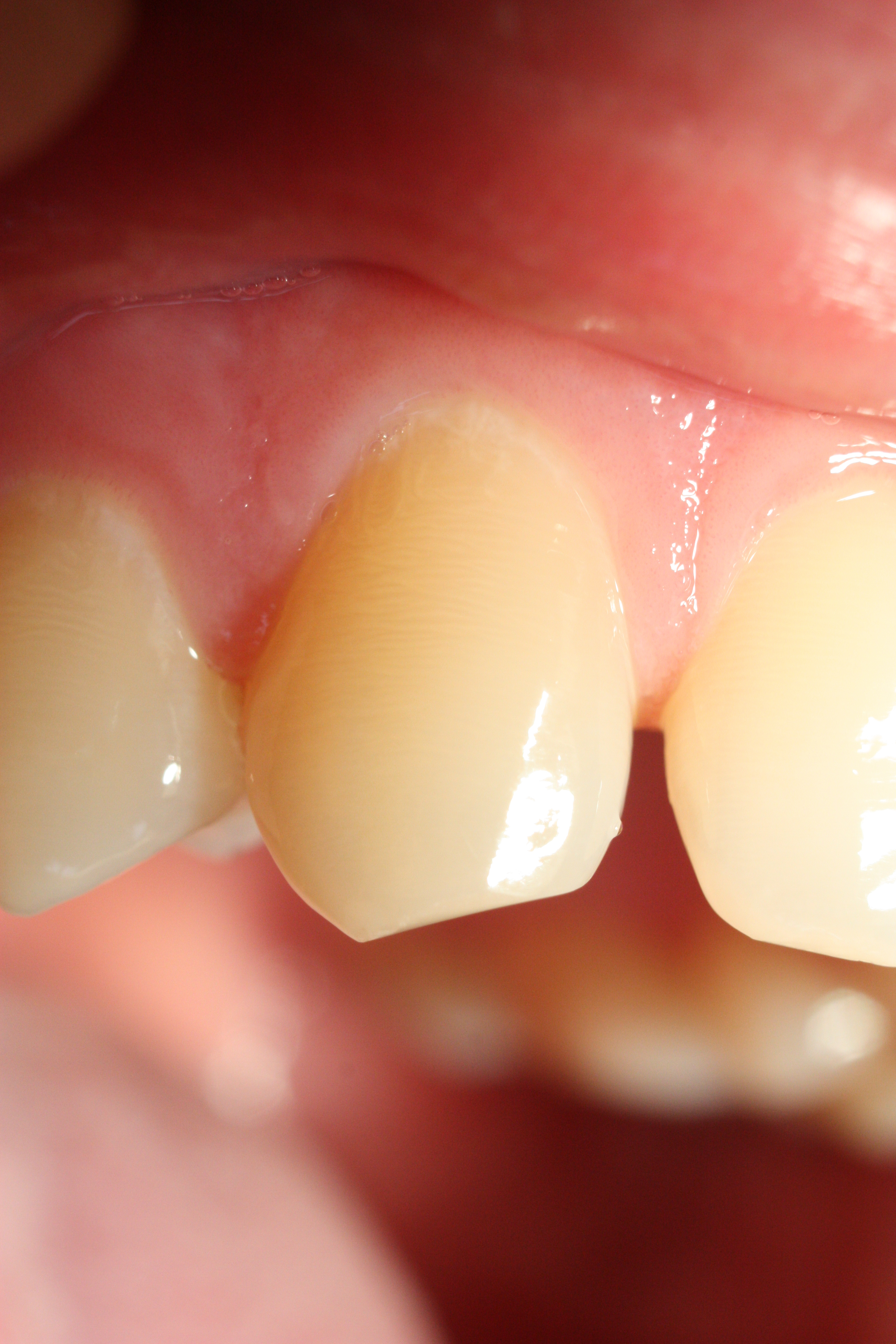
The terminations of striae of Retzius in a canine, called perikymata. (Visible in the picture's high resolution)

When viewed microscopically in cross-section, they appear as concentric rings. In a longitudinal section, they appear as a series of dark bands. The presence of the dark lines is similar to the annual rings on a tree. They are named after Swedish anatomist Anders Retzius.

In the longitudinal section of a tooth, these lines appear near the dentin. They bend obliquely near the cervical region. They curve occlusally near the cuspal regions or the incisal regions.

Produced during the second stage of enamel calcification, also known as the maturation stage, ameloblasts produce matrix and enamel at the rate of 4 micrometers per day; however every fourth day there is a change in development. Brownish lines, the striae of Retzius, develop as a result of a change in the growth process. Macroscopically, these lines can be seen on the labial surface or lip side of anterior or front teeth as horizontal lines on the tooth crown, also known as perikymata or "imbrication lines" .

Evenly spaced Retzius lines indicate a 6- to 11-day cycle of enamel formation.

== Causes ==
Occasional darker striae or grooves of Retzius result from systemic disturbances in the human body. For example, a fever can cause some lines to appear darker than those surrounding them. Normally, amelogenesis involves a period of enamel matrix formation and a rest period. In case of any disturbance, the rest periods are prolonged and occur close to one another. Consequently, the line of Retzius appears broader and much more prominent, often presenting a brownish colour under the microscope. The neonatal line is the darkest band, which represents the disrupted enamel formation due to the stress of being born.

It is also said to occur due to periodic bending of enamel rods.

The formation of the striae of Retzius results from a constriction of Tomes' processes when the activity of ameloblasts – cells only present in laying down enamel – is narrowed in conjunction with an increasing process of interrod enamel development. The striae of Retzius often extends from the Dental-enamel junction to the outer surface, ending in shallow pits known as perikymata.

== Qualities ==
Lines of Retzius (think age bands like tree growth rings) – Stria (A)

- artifacts in enamel (not found in dentin) created by incremental steps of ameloblasts
- comparable to the contour "lines of Owen" in dentin
- have increased organic content and show the variations in rhythm as the tooth enamel matrix calcifies
- follow an appositional or side-by-side growth pattern

== Illustrations ==
Several diagrams and photographs of these lines (and others) appears in a document published by the Max Planck Institute for Evolutionary Anthropology on their website:
