= Amelogenesis imperfecta =

Genetic disorder resulting in abnormal enamel

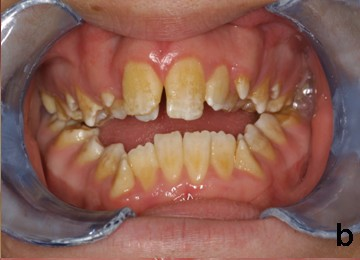
- Amelogenesis imperfecta, hypoplastic type. Note the association of pitted enamel and open bite.
- Specialty: Dentistry

Amelogenesis imperfecta (AI) is a group of congenital disorders, involving the abnormal formation of tooth enamel, the external layer of the crown of teeth. Amelogenesis imperfecta can be unrelated to any systemic or generalized conditions or can be part of a syndromic condition.

Amelogenesis is the process of enamel formation. Healthy, fully formed enamel is approximately 96% mineral by weight and forms over months to years in humans, depending upon the tooth in question.

Amelogenesis imperfecta typically occurs as a result of mutations in the genes that encode proteins directly involved in tooth enamel formation, although there are some rare exceptions. Knowledge of the specific functions of some of the proteins encoded by these genes is incomplete. In short, pathogenic variants in these genes prevent amelogenesis occurring as it should, leading to amelogenesis imperfecta.

People with amelogenesis imperfecta may have teeth with thin or even absent enamel or enamel which is soft or brittle. Their remaining tooth enamel or tooth surface may be of abnormal color, for example yellow, brown or opaque white, and may be pitted. Affected teeth have a higher risk for dental cavities and are likely to be hypersensitive to temperature changes. Teeth may exhibit rapid wear post-eruption and may have excessive dental plaque deposition due to pain upon brushing.

== History ==
Amelogenesis imperfecta was first recognised as a separate condition to dentinogenesis imperfecta in 1938. There have been many attempts to classify subtypes of amelogenesis imperfecta since 1945, first based on appearance alone and then also on the underlying genetic defect. The first gene to be identified for which pathogenic variants cause amelogenesis imperfecta was amelogenin X chromosome (AMELX) in 1991. The first national genetic screen for amelogenesis imperfecta was developed in the UK and commissioned by the National Health Service in 2021. Clinical decision flowcharts for the treatment of childhood amelogenesis imperfecta in the UK were published in 2025.

The earliest known case of enamel changes consistent with probable amelogenesis imperfecta is in an extinct hominid species called Paranthropus robustus, with over a third of individuals displaying this condition.

== Genetics ==
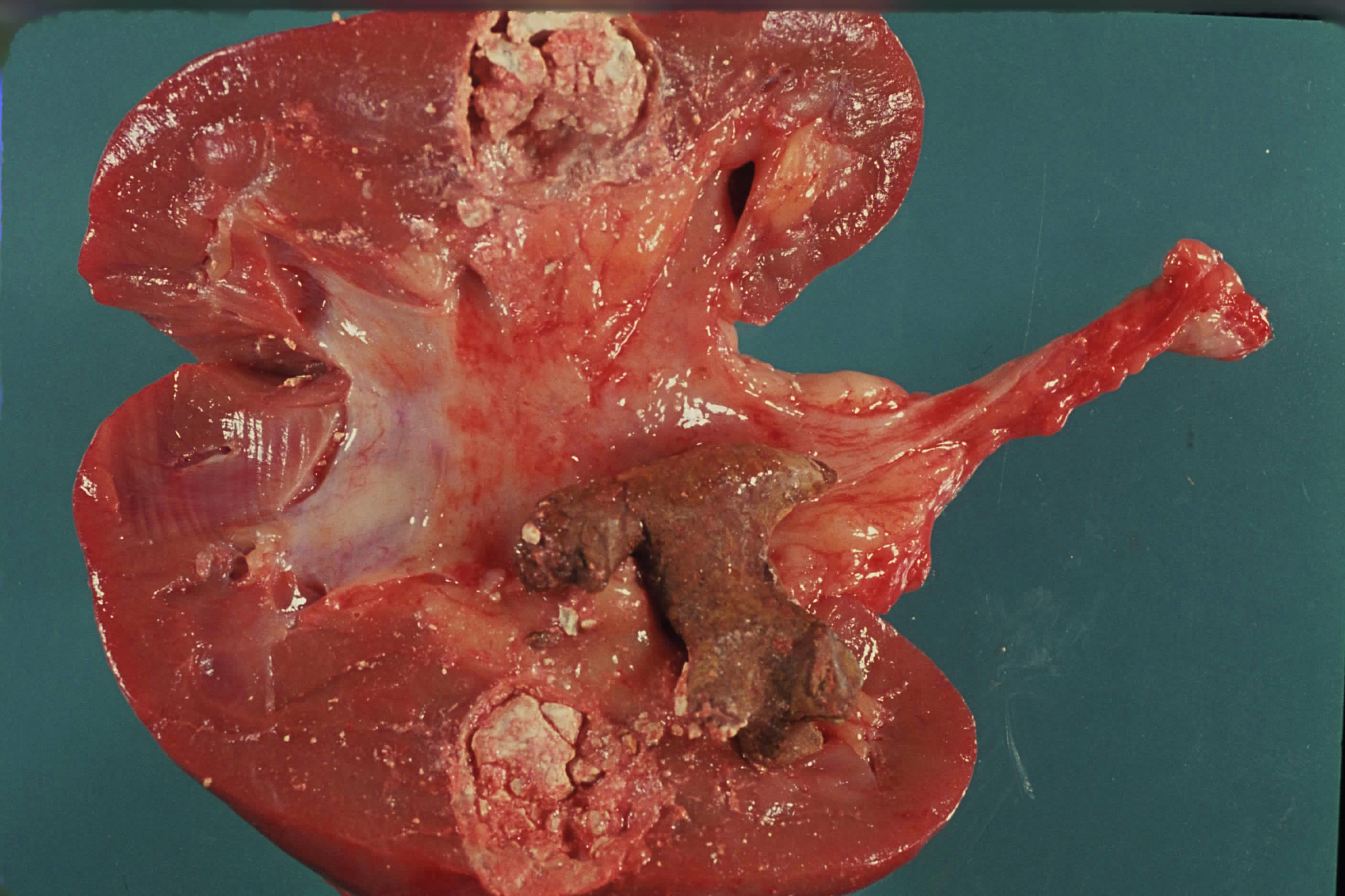
Kidney showing circumscribed calcium deposits together with a partial stag horn calculus

Reviews of the genetics of amelogenesis imperfecta estimate that mutations in more than 90 genes may cause the condition, including syndromic forms. Non-syndromic disease can be hard to define before genetic diagnosis since other associated health conditions, for example kidney calcification, are not always initially present nor identified and can sometimes develop later in life.

Early research focused on study of the genes that encode the enamel matrix proteins (such as amelogenin (AMELX), enamelin (ENAM)) and the enamel proteases (matrix metalloproteinase 20 (MMP20) and kallikrein related peptidase 4 (KLK4)) to identify mutations through targeted Sanger sequencing. Massively parallel sequencing has greatly accelerated the discovery of genes involved in human diseases. In the case of amelogenesis imperfecta, the first gene with disease causing variants identified using this method was reported in 2013. Since then, this approach has significantly increased the pace of identification of genes associated with the condition. However, research suggests that more genes for which pathogenic variants cause amelogenesis imperfecta remain to be identified.

Genes in which pathogenic variants cause amelogenesis imperfecta include, but are not limited to; AMELX, ENAM, AMBN, AMTN, ACP4 (originally published as ACPT), MMP20, KLK4, FAM83H, WDR72, ODAPH (originally published as C4orf26), SLC24A4, LAMB3, ITGB6,, FAM20A, FAM20C, COL17A1, LTBP3, SP6 and GPR68.

Amelogenesis imperfecta is identified in families with disease segregating in autosomal recessive, autosomal dominant and X-linked inheritance patterns. Sporadic disease also occurs. Amelogenesis imperfecta caused by variants in some genes can display both recessive and dominant inheritance patterns (for example, AMBN).

Cohort studies have shown that mutations in particular genes are more commonly identified in amelogenesis imperfecta than others; one study highlighted COL17A1, MMP20, FAM83H, ENAM and AMELX in one cohort of 181 people with amelogenesis imperfecta (note that some individuals had been prescreened for variants in selected genes). Another study highlighted AMELX, MMP20 and FAM83H as more commonly identified in individuals with isolated amelogenesis imperfecta and LTBP3 and FAM20A in syndromic conditions involving amelogenesis imperfecta.

== Diagnosis ==
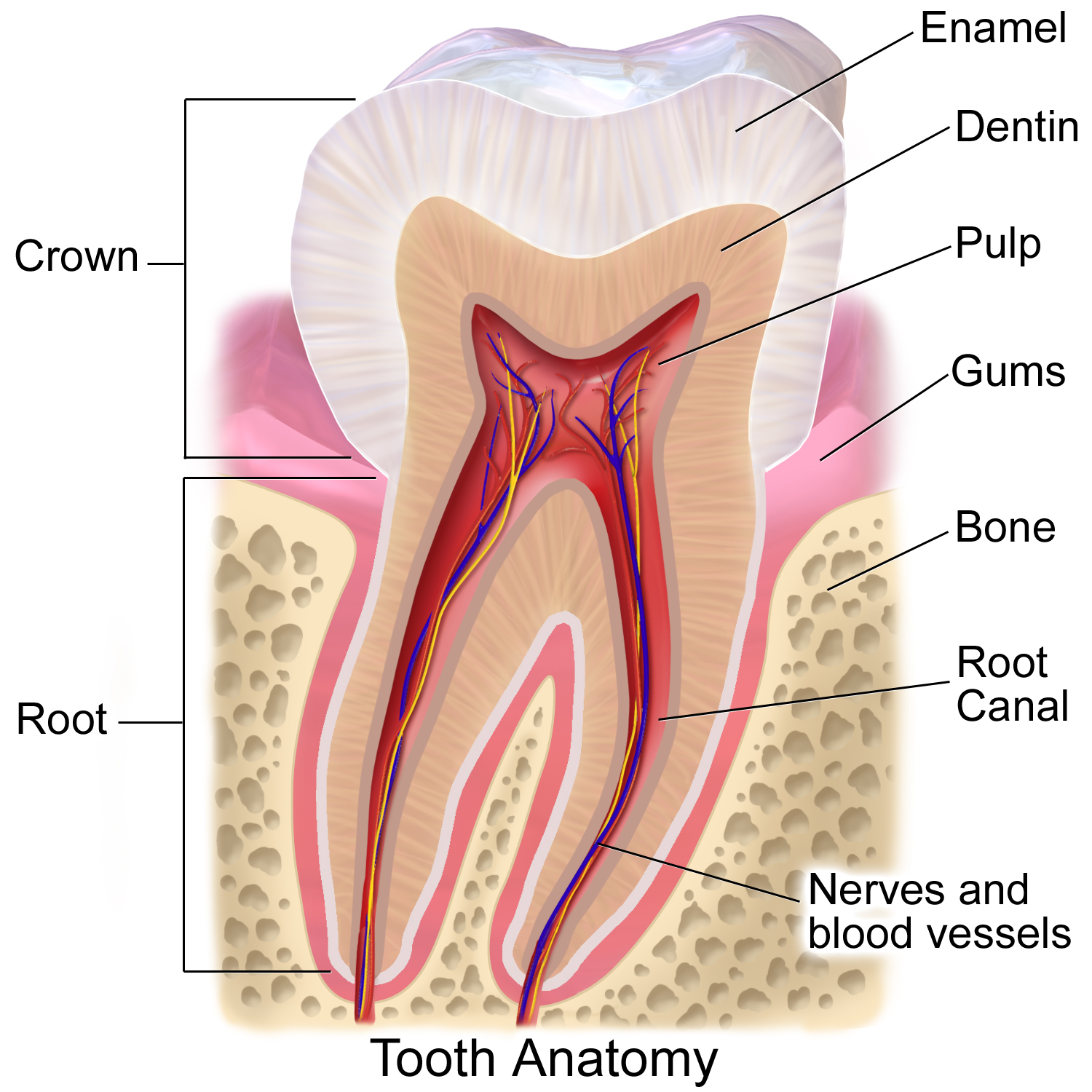
A model showing a cross-section of a tooth, including the enamel (cross section)

All teeth in both dentitions are affected by amelogenesis imperfecta,. The primary teeth may appear less severely affected, or amelogenesis imperfecta may be masked by poor oral hygiene and greater caries susceptibility in children and by the thinner enamel present in the primary teeth. This diagnostic criterion of affecting all teeth of both dentitions is an important distinction between amelogenesis imperfecta and other more common conditions such as molar hypomineralisation and dental fluorosis, which are both influenced by the non-genetic factors during enamel development.

In general, there are three distinct appearances (phenotypes) of enamel affected by amelogenesis imperfecta, which can be defined based on the thickness and hardness of enamel and reflect the stage at which amelogenesis failed, together with a fourth category which includes changes to tooth shape. Failure during the secretory stage results in hypoplastic (thin) enamel, which is of similar hardness to healthy enamel. Failure during the maturation stage results in hypocalcified (soft) or hypomature (brittle) enamel that may still be of similar thickness to healthy enamel before tooth eruption, but that wears away quickly. The fourth category is a specific form of the disease in which hypoplastic or hypomature enamel co-occurs with taurodontism, where teeth have smaller roots but the body of the tooth is enlarged. All of these types overlap, and mixed phenotypes can occur. The degree of failure can also vary, resulting in phenotypes ranging from no enamel at all to only very mild changes that may remain undiagnosed without the input of a dental specialist.

Therefore, amelogenesis imperfecta can be broadly classified according to clinical appearance and dental radiography:

Type 1 - Hypoplastic
Enamel of abnormal thickness due to a malfunction in enamel matrix formation. Enamel is very thin but hard & translucent, and may have random pits & grooves. The condition is of an autosomal dominant, autosomal recessive, or X-linked pattern. Enamel differs in appearance from dentine radiographically as normal functional enamel.
Type 2 - Hypomaturation
Enamel has sound thickness, with a pitted appearance. It is less hard compared to normal enamel and is prone to rapid wear, although not as intensely as Type 3 AI. The condition is of an autosomal dominant, autosomal recessive, or X-linked pattern. Enamel appears comparable to dentine in its radiodensity on radiographs.
Type 3 - Hypocalcified
Enamel defect due to malfunction of enamel calcification; therefore, enamel is of normal thickness but is extremely brittle, with an opaque/chalky presentation. Teeth are prone to staining and rapid wear, exposing dentine. The condition has an autosomal dominant or autosomal recessive pattern. Enamel appears less radioopaque compared to dentine on radiographs.
Type 4 - Hypomature hypoplastic enamel with taurodontism
Enamel varies in appearance, with mixed features from Type 1 and Type 2 AI. All Type 4 AI have taurodontism in common. The condition has an autosomal dominant pattern. Other common features may include an anterior open bite taurodontism, sensitivity of teeth.

Differential diagnosis includes dental fluorosis, molar incisor hypomineralisation (now officially termed "molar hypomineralisation") and chronological disorders of tooth development.

People with amelogenesis imperfecta may have teeth with abnormal colour, most often yellow, brown or white. Enamel pitting may be present. Teeth will be at higher risk of caries, may be hypersensitive to temperature changes and will experience rapid attrition. Diagnosis is via physical examination and use of panoramic radiographs. Treatment aims to maintain function and aesthetics.

Some individuals with pathogenic variants in particular genes associated with the disease may have other health conditions that are not immediately obvious without further investigations, but that may progress to cause more serious disease. This is particularly true of individuals with mutations in families with sequence similarity 20 member A (FAM20A), where kidney calcification can occur.

In the UK, patients diagnosed with amelogenesis imperfecta are offered genetic testing through the NHS Genetic Medicine Service using the R340 panel test. In the US, testing is available via independent laboratories including Prevention Genetics, Fulgent Genetics, Blueprint Genetics and others. In France, genetic testing is available via the GenoDENT panel.

== Treatment ==
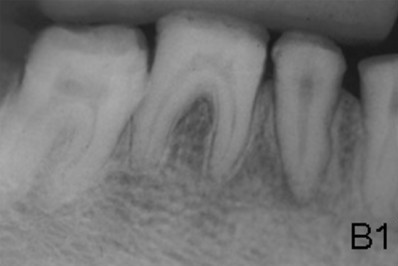
X-ray showing lack of enamel opacity and a pathological loss of enamel in patient with amelogenesis imperfecta

Management of amelogenesis imperfecta is case-dependent, but there are overarching principles to follow, often requiring specialist dental input. Overall, there are two aims: to maintain tooth structure and therefore also function and to improve aesthetics.

Specific challenges in managing amelogenesis imperfecta include masking the discolouration of teeth (due to thinner enamel or loss of enamel and exposure of underlying dentine), hypersensitivity during treatment, poor oral hygiene (often due to pain upon brushing or flossing), loss of inter-occlusal space due to tooth loss or wear, and in the case of restorative treatments, decreased bond strength. People with amelogenesis imperfecta (and relevant healthcare providers) also face increased dental treatments and costs.

The psychological and societal impacts of amelogenesis imperfecta are underappreciated and often not formally addressed, as it can be associated with embarrassment and social avoidance. Completion of patient-reported outcome measures can help to understand individuals' concerns and inform treatment discussions.

Evidence-based treatment for amelogenesis imperfecta is lacking; however, a UK-based consensus on the treatment of childhood amelogenesis imperfecta has been published. Treatment aims vary and are dependent on the phenotype but include: managing aesthetics, improving oral hygiene and prevention and management of sensitivity and post-eruptive breakdown. Treatment options also vary due to patient factors such as age and dental anxiety. Management of amelogenesis imperfecta in childhood is important, but challenges of care also extend into adulthood. Protecting vulnerable enamel (due to hypoplastic or hypocalcified phenotypes) is key. Treatment options can extend from minimally invasive fissure sealants, to direct composite restorations, to more advanced options such as indirect options: for example, onlays or crowns.

If a genetic diagnosis is made, it may also help healthcare professionals to prevent or to initiate treatment of previously unknown related health problems. For example, if harmful variants within the FAM20A gene are identified, regular monitoring of kidney health, and preventive treatment with medications that reduce the risk of kidney calcification, may be recommended.

== Epidemiology ==
The exact prevalence of amelogenesis imperfecta is uncertain and may vary. Estimates vary widely, from 1 in 233 people in Turkey, 1 in 714 people in a study of an isolated Swedish population, 1 in 4,000 people in Sweden generally 1 in 1000 in Argentina, to 1 in 14,000 people in the United States. The prevalence of amelogenesis imperfecta in non-human animals has not been explored, however its presence has been noted.
