= FAM20A =

Protein-coding gene in the species Homo sapiens

Identifiers
- Aliases: FAM20A, AI1G, AIGFS, FP2747, family with sequence similarity 20 member A, golgi associated secretory pathway pseudokinase, FAM20A golgi associated secretory pathway pseudokinase
- External IDs: OMIM: 611062; MGI: 2388266; GeneCards: FAM20A

Gene location (Human)
| Chr. | Chromosome 17 (human) |
| Band | 17q24.2 | Start | 68,535,113 bp |
| Band | 17q24.2 | End | 68,601,367 bp |

Gene location (Mouse)
| Chr. | Chromosome 11 (mouse) |
| Band | 11|11 E1 | Start | 109,560,575 bp |
| Band | 11|11 E1 | End | 109,613,105 bp |
RNA expression pattern
| Bgee | Human / Mouse (ortholog); Top expressed in: right lobe of liver; smooth muscle tissue; upper lobe of left lung; left testis; right testis; stromal cell of endometrium; body of uterus; canal of the cervix; minor salivary glands; body of stomach / Top expressed in: molar; vestibular membrane of cochlear duct; seminiferous tubule; left lobe of liver; stria vascularis; islet of Langerhans; spermatid; stroma of bone marrow; parotid gland; vestibular labyrinth; More reference expression data |
| BioGPS | n/a |
Gene ontology
| Molecular function | protein serine/threonine kinase activity; protein serine/threonine kinase activator activity; protein binding; phosphotransferase activity, alcohol group as acceptor |
| Cellular component | extracellular region; extracellular exosome; endoplasmic reticulum; extracellular space; Golgi apparatus |
| Biological process | biomineral tissue development; enamel mineralization; positive regulation of protein phosphorylation; calcium ion homeostasis; tooth eruption; positive regulation of protein serine/threonine kinase activity; protein phosphorylation; response to bacterium |
Sources:Amigo / QuickGO
Orthologs
| Databases | NCBI: entry; OMA: entry |
| Species | Human | Mouse |
| Entrez | 54757 | 208659 |
| Ensembl | ENSG00000108950 | ENSMUSG00000020614 |
| UniProt | Q96MK3 | Q8CID3 |
| RefSeq (mRNA) | NM_001243746; NM_017565 | NM_153782 |
| RefSeq (protein) | NP_001230675; NP_060035 | NP_722477 |
| Location (UCSC) | Chr 17: 68.54 – 68.6 Mb | Chr 11: 109.56 – 109.61 Mb |
| PubMed search |
- Wikidata
| View/Edit Human | View/Edit Mouse |

Pseudokinase FAM20A is a protein that in humans is encoded by the FAM20A gene.

== Function ==
FAM20A belongs to an evolutionarily conserved family of secreted proteins expressed in many tissues. This locus encodes a protein that is likely secreted and may function in hematopoiesis. Alternatively spliced transcript variants have been identified. [provided by RefSeq, Aug 2011]

== Clinical significance ==
A mutation in FAM20A was reported to be associated with amelogenesis imperfecta, an inherited enamel defect, and gingival hyperplasia syndrome.

Human mutations in FAM20A were also reported to cause Enamel-Renal Syndrome, an autosomal recessive disorder characterized by severe enamel hypoplasia, failed tooth eruption, intrapulpal calcifications, enlarged gingiva, and nephrocalcinosis.
