= Interrod enamel =

Interrod enamel is histologically identified on microscopic views of tooth enamel. Because interrod enamel is located around enamel rods, the areas of interrod enamel enhances the "keyhole" appearance of enamel rods by acting as its border. The location where the two areas of enamel meet is known as the rod sheath.

All tooth enamel, including interrod enamel and enamel rods, is made by ameloblasts. However, interrod enamel is formed slightly sooner than enamel rods.

Interrod enamel has the same composition as enamel rods. A distinction is made between the two because they differ in the direction of their crystalline patterns.
