= Enamel-renal syndrome =

Enamel-Renal syndrome
- Autosomal recessive pattern is the inheritance manner of this condition.
- Specialty: Gastroenterology

Enamel-renal syndrome is a rare autosomal recessive condition. This condition is also known as idiopathic multicentric osteolysis with nephropathy. It is characterised by dental abnormalities and nephrocalcinosis.

== Presentation ==
The dental abnormalities include

- hypoplastic amelogenesis imperfecta
- microdontia
- intra-pulpal calcification
- impacted posterior teeth with hyperplastic pericoronal follicles
- gingival fibromatosis
- ectopic calcifications on gingival and pericoronal tissues

== Genetics ==
This condition is caused by mutations in the FAM20A gene. This gene encodes a protein – the Golgi apparatus associated secretory pathway pseudokinase. The gene is located on the long arm of chromosome 17 (17q24.2).

== Pathogensis ==
The protein is an allosteric activator of the Golgi serine/threonine protein kinase and is involved in biomineralization of teeth.

== Diagnosis ==
The diagnosis may be suspected on the basis of the constellation of clinical features. It is made by sequencing the FAM20A gene.

This condition is usually diagnosed in childhood but may not be recognised until early adulthood. The diagnosis is suspected on the combination of nephrocalcinosis and dental abnormalities.

=== Differential diagnosis ===
- Epidermolysis bullosa
- Jalili syndrome
- Raine syndrome
- Tricho-dento-osseous syndrome

== Treatment ==
There is no specific treatment for this condition currently known and management of its various features is the norm.

== History ==
This condition was first described in 1972.
