= Dentistry in Israel =

Dentistry in Israel is taught at two dental schools and several post-graduate training centers.

== Dental schools ==
- Hebrew University-Hadassah School of Dental Medicine in Jerusalem, founded by the Alpha Omega fraternity
- Tel Aviv University School of Dental Medicine in Tel Aviv

Dental training centers include Rambam Health Care Campus in Haifa and Barzilai Medical Center in Ashkelon.

== Overview ==
With 7,500 practicing dentists and close to 300 new dentists joining the profession each year, Israel has one of the highest proportions of dentists in the general population in the world. Around 85% of all dentists in Israel work in private clinics or group practice. There are 5,000 private dental clinics in Israel as well as 200 clinics operated by health funds.

Israel has 60 companies that manufacture dental supplies and equipment, including dental labs and implants, X-rays, attachments, polishers, mixers, bur sets, and diamond instruments.

All children up to age 18 are eligible for free dental care as part of the health basket.

== Dental research ==
The human encoding gene for tuftelin (TUFT1) was cloned by Dany Deutsch and Aharon Palmon of the Hadassah School of Dental Medicine.

== See also ==
- Healthcare in Israel
- List of medical schools in Israel
- Dentistry throughout the world
- American Dental Volunteers for Israel
