= Enamelin =

Mammalian protein found in Homo sapiens

ENAM

Identifiers
- Aliases: ENAM, AIH2, AI1C, ADAI, enamelin
- External IDs: OMIM: 606585; MGI: 1333772; GeneCards: ENAM

Gene location (Human)
Chr.	Chromosome 4 (human)
Band	4q13.3	Start	70,628,744 bp
Band	4q13.3	End	70,646,824 bp

Gene location (Mouse)
Chr.	Chromosome 5 (mouse)
Band	5|5 E1	Start	88,635,834 bp
Band	5|5 E1	End	88,653,908 bp
RNA expression pattern
Bgee	Human / Mouse (ortholog); Top expressed in: testicle; islet of Langerhans; vastus lateralis muscle; striated muscle tissue; biceps brachii; Skeletal muscle tissue of biceps brachii; human kidney; deltoid muscle; corpus epididymis; buccal mucosa cell / Top expressed in: molar; tracheobronchial tree; intestinal villus; Ileal epithelium; perirhinal cortex; choroid plexus of fourth ventricle; CA3 field; lactiferous gland; inferior colliculi; superior colliculus; More reference expression data
BioGPS	n/a
Gene ontology
Molecular function	structural constituent of tooth enamel; protein binding
Cellular component	extracellular region; endoplasmic reticulum lumen; extracellular matrix
Biological process	odontogenesis of dentin-containing tooth; biomineral tissue development; amelogenesis; regulation of cell morphogenesis; ameloblast differentiation; positive regulation of enamel mineralization; post-translational protein modification
Sources:Amigo / QuickGO
Orthologs
Databases	NCBI: entry; OMA: entry
Species	Human	Mouse
Entrez	10117	13801
Ensembl	ENSG00000132464	ENSMUSG00000029286
UniProt	Q9NRM1	O55196
RefSeq (mRNA)	NM_031889; NM_001368133	NM_017468
RefSeq (protein)	NP_114095; NP_001355062	NP_059496
Location (UCSC)	Chr 4: 70.63 – 70.65 Mb	Chr 5: 88.64 – 88.65 Mb
PubMed search
- Wikidata
View/Edit Human	View/Edit Mouse

Enamelin

Identifiers
- Symbol: Enamelin
- Pfam: PF15362
Available protein structures:
- PDB: PF15362 (ECOD; PDBsum)
- AlphaFold: PF15362

Enamelin is an enamel matrix protein (EMPs), that in humans is encoded by the ENAM gene. It is part of the non-amelogenins, which comprise 10% of the total enamel matrix proteins. It is one of the key proteins thought to be involved in amelogenesis (enamel development). The formation of enamel's intricate architecture is thought to be rigorously controlled in ameloblasts through interactions of various organic matrix protein molecules that include: enamelin, amelogenin, ameloblastin, tuftelin, dentine sialophosphoprotein, and a variety of enzymes. Enamelin is the largest protein (~168kDa) in the enamel matrix of developing teeth and is the least abundant (encompasses approximately 1-5%) of total enamel matrix proteins. It is present predominantly at the growing enamel surface.

== Structure ==
Enamelin is thought to be the oldest member of the enamel matrix protein (EMP) family, with animal studies showing remarkable conservation of the gene phylogenetically. All other EMPs are derived from enamelin, such as amelogenin. EMPs belong to a larger family of proteins termed 'secretory calcium-binding phosphoproteins' (SCPP).

Similar to other enamel matrix proteins, enamelin undergoes extensive post-translational modifications (mainly phosphorylation), processing, and secretion by proteases. Enamelin has three putative phosphoserines (Ser^{54}, Ser^{191}, and Ser^{216} in humans) phosphorylated by a Golgi-associated secretory pathway kinase (FAM20C) based on their distinctive Ser-x-Glu (S-x-E) motifs. The major secretory product of the ENAM gene has 1103 amino acids (post-secretion), and has an acidic isoelectric point ranging from 4.5–6.5 (depending on the fragment).

At the secretory stage, the enzyme matrix metalloproteinase-20 (MMP20) proteolytically cleaves the secreted enamelin protein immediately upon release, into several smaller polypeptides; each having their own functions. However, the whole protein (~168 kDa) and its largest derivative fragment (~89 kDa) are undetectable in the secretory stage; these are existent only at the mineralisation front. Smaller polypeptide fragments remain embedded in the enamel, throughout the secretory stage enamel matrix. These strongly bind to the mineral and arrest seeded crystal growth.

== Function ==
The primary function of the proteins acts at the mineralisation front; growth sites where it is the interface between the ameloblast plasma membrane and lengthening extremity of crystals. The key activities of enamelin can be summarised:

- Necessary for the adhesion of ameloblasts to the surface of the enamel in the secretory stage
- Binds to hydroxyapatite and promotes crystallite elongation
- Act as a modulator for de novo mineral formation

It is speculated that this protein could interact with amelogenin or other enamel matrix proteins and be important in determining growth of the length of enamel crystallites. The mechanism of this proposed co-interaction is synergistic ("Goldilocks effect"). With enamelin enhancing the rates of crystal nucleation via the creation of addition sites for EMPs, such as amelogenin, to template calcium phosphate nucleation.

It is best thought to understand the overarching function of enamelin as the proteins responsible for correct enamel thickness formation.

== Clinical significance ==
Mutations in the ENAM gene can cause certain subtypes of amelogenesis imperfecta (AI), a heterogenous group of heritable conditions in which enamel in malformed. Point mutations can cause autosomal-dominant hypoplastic AI, and novel ENAM mutations can cause autosomal-recessive hypoplastic AI. However, mutations in the ENAM gene mainly tend to lead to the autosomal-dominant AI. The phenotype of the mutations are generalised thin enamel and no defined enamel layer.

A moderately higher than usual ENAM expression leads to protrusive structures (often, horizontal grooves) on the surface of enamel, and with high transgene expression, the enamel layer is almost lost.

== See also ==
- Ameloblastin
- Amelogenin
- Amelogenesis
- Amelogenesis imperfecta
