= Tuftelin =

Protein found in humans

TUFT1

Identifiers
- Aliases: TUFT1, entrez:7286, tuftelin 1
- External IDs: OMIM: 600087; MGI: 109572; GeneCards: TUFT1

Gene location (Human)
Chr.	Chromosome 1 (human)
Band	1q21.3	Start	151,540,305 bp
Band	1q21.3	End	151,583,583 bp

Gene location (Mouse)
Chr.	Chromosome 3 (mouse)
Band	3|3 F2.1	Start	94,520,064 bp
Band	3|3 F2.1	End	94,566,179 bp
RNA expression pattern
Bgee	Human / Mouse (ortholog); Top expressed in: amniotic fluid; pancreatic ductal cell; skin of thigh; hair follicle; skin of arm; skin of hip; gingival epithelium; skin of abdomen; buccal mucosa cell; human penis / Top expressed in: lip; skin of external ear; esophagus; retinal pigment epithelium; epidermis; hair follicle; gastrula; corneal stroma; decidua; skin of back; More reference expression data
BioGPS	n/a
Gene ontology
Molecular function	structural constituent of tooth enamel; protein binding
Cellular component	cytoplasm; extracellular region; intracellular anatomical structure
Biological process	biomineral tissue development; bone mineralization; odontogenesis; intracellular signal transduction
Sources:Amigo / QuickGO
Orthologs
Databases	NCBI: entry; OMA: entry
Species	Human	Mouse
Entrez	7286	22156
Ensembl	ENSG00000143367	ENSMUSG00000005968
UniProt	Q9NNX1	O08970
RefSeq (mRNA)	NM_001126337; NM_001301317; NM_020127	NM_011656; NM_001293728
RefSeq (protein)	NP_001119809; NP_001288246; NP_064512	NP_001280657; NP_035786
Location (UCSC)	Chr 1: 151.54 – 151.58 Mb	Chr 3: 94.52 – 94.57 Mb
PubMed search
- Wikidata
View/Edit Human	View/Edit Mouse

Tuftelin is an acidic phosphorylated glycoprotein found in tooth enamel. In humans, the tuftelin protein is encoded by the TUFT1 gene. It is an acidic protein that is thought to play a role in dental enamel mineralization and is implicated in caries susceptibility. It is also thought to be involved with adaptation to hypoxia, mesenchymal stem cell function, and neurotrophin nerve growth factor mediated neuronal differentiation.

== Classification ==
There are two kinds of enamel proteins: amelogenins and nonamelogenins. Tuftelin falls under nonamelogenins.

== Function ==
This protein is formed for a short time during amelogenesis. The function of tuftelins is under contention, but it is proposed that it acts to start the mineralization process of enamel during tooth development.

Other significant proteins in enamel are amelogenins, enamelins, and ameloblastins.

== Research ==
The human encoding gene for tuftelin (TUFT1) was cloned by Profs. Danny Deutsch and Aharon Palmon from the Hebrew University-Hadassah School of Dental Medicine in Jerusalem.

== Interactions ==
Tuftelin has been shown to interact with TFIP11.
