= American Dental Volunteers for Israel =

Organization

- Abbreviation: ADVI
- Formation: 1972
- Dissolved: 1997
- Type: Voluntary association
- Legal status: Non Profit Organization
- Purpose: Providing Dental Volunteer Service
- Headquarters: Great Neck, New York, United States
- Location(s): Israel and United States
- Founder and Chairman: Dr. Robert S. Breakstone
- Volunteers: 1,500

American Dental Volunteers for Israel was a voluntary organization of dentists and dental hygienists from the United States providing services in Israel.

== History ==
Founded in 1972, by Dr. Robert S. Breakstone, ADVI was the first organization to establish a framework in which American dental professionals could volunteer their services in Israel. Its mission was to provide free high-level professional dental care for Israelis primarily on Kibbutzim. ADVI was set up after Dr. Breakstone first volunteered on Kibbutz Sha'ar HaAmakim in 1970. Upon returning to the USA he established ADVI, and was able to secure the cooperation of the emissary of the Kibbutz Aliyah Desk in New York City in placing hundreds of dentists who were prepared to offer their services for a minimum of two weeks each year in return for modest accommodations on a Kibbutz.

Eight years later in 1980, a parallel organization, Dental Volunteers for Israel (DVI) was created to provide free dental services to poor children in Israeli urban settings. With Holocaust survivor Trudi Birger at the helm, DVI founders established the free Jerusalem clinic, the sole remaining clinic in Israel where foreign dentists may legally volunteer.

ADVI slowly phased out in the late 1990s, in good part because of a feeling from the Ministry of Health that Israel was by then producing enough dentists to fill the country's needs. ADVI donated a large share of its remaining funds to DVI and a plaque was hung in the Trudi Birger Clinic to honor ADVI leaders: Dr Robert Breakstone (Founder and President from 1973-1983), Paul Jarmon (President from 1984-1993), and Robert E. Lewis (President from 1993-1997).

== Membership ==
At its height ADVI was sending between 200 and 300 dentists a year to Israel, with an estimated 1500 dental volunteers throughout its existence.

== See also ==
- Dentistry in Israel
