= Rod sheath =

Tooth structure

Rod sheath is an area identified in histologic sections of a tooth. It is found where enamel rods, the functional unit of enamel, meet interrod enamel. The crystals of both types of enamel meet at sharp angles and form the appearance of a space called the rod sheath. As a result of this space, the rod sheath consists of more protein (as opposed to minerals) than other areas of enamel. For this reason, the rod sheath is characterized as being hypomineralized in comparison to the rest of the highly mineralized enamel.

Additionally, the rod sheath is attributed with giving tooth enamel a "fish-scale" appearance under a microscope when the enamel has been demineralized or acid-etched.

The rod sheath is Inorganic matrix tying the enamel rods together
