= Neonatal line =

The neonatal line is a particular band of incremental growth lines seen in histologic sections of both enamel and dentin of primary teeth. It belongs to a series of a growth lines in tooth enamel known as the Striae of Retzius denoting the prolonged rest period of enamel formation that occurs at the time of birth. The neonatal line is darker and larger than the rest of the striae of retzius. The neonatal line is the demarcation between the enamel formation before birth and after birth i.e., prenatal and postnatal enamel respectively. It is caused by the different physiologic changes at birth and is used to identify enamel formation before and after birth. The position of the neonatal line differs from tooth to tooth

== Formation ==
The formation of the neonatal line is caused by changes in the direction and degree of tooth mineralization caused by the biological stress from passing into extra uterine life. Specific factors underlying its formation and width still remain unclear.

== Forensic Dentistry ==
In forensic dentistry, the neonatal line can be used to distinguish matters such as if a child died before or after birth and approximately how long a child lived after birth. The neonatal line can be used as a marker for the exact period of survival of an infant through the measurement of the amount of postnatal hard tissue formation and examination of the thickness of the neonatal line.
