= TFIP11 =

Protein-coding gene in humans

Identifiers
- Aliases: TFIP11, NTR1, Spp382, TIP39, bK445C9.6, hNtr1, tuftelin interacting protein 11, STIP, STIP-1
- External IDs: OMIM: 612747; MGI: 1930075; GeneCards: TFIP11

Gene location (Human)
Chr.	Chromosome 22 (human)
Band	22q12.1	Start	26,491,225 bp
Band	22q12.1	End	26,512,505 bp

Gene location (Mouse)
Chr.	Chromosome 5 (mouse)
Band	5|5 F	Start	112,474,224 bp
Band	5|5 F	End	112,485,939 bp
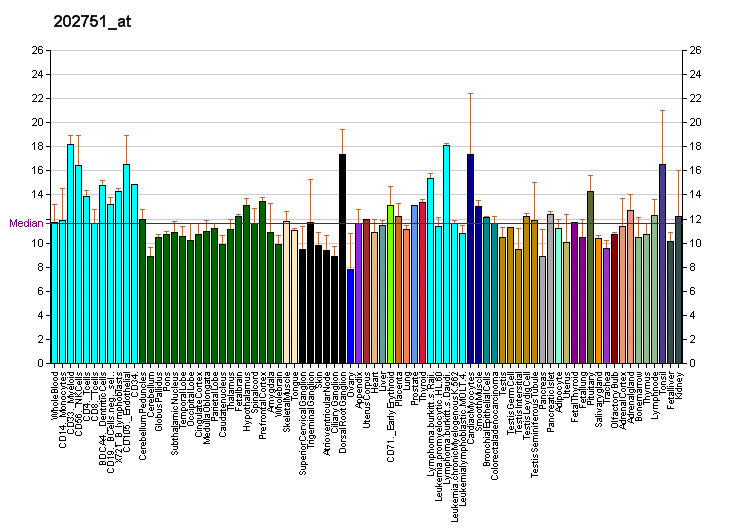

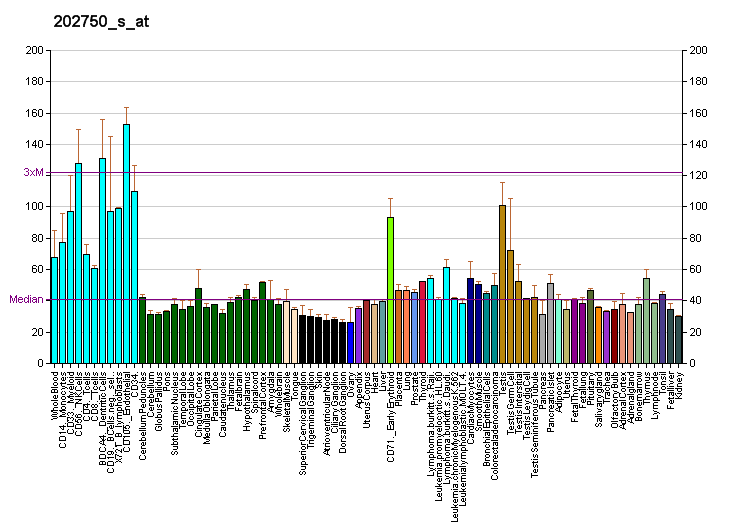
RNA expression pattern
Bgee	Human / Mouse (ortholog); Top expressed in: granulocyte; muscle of thigh; gastrocnemius muscle; apex of heart; testicle; tendon of biceps brachii; sural nerve; left testis; Achilles tendon; right testis / Top expressed in: superior surface of tongue; gallbladder; granulocyte; Rostral migratory stream; neural layer of retina; dentate gyrus of hippocampal formation granule cell; superior frontal gyrus; epiblast; ventricular zone; yolk sac; More reference expression data
BioGPS	More reference expression data
Gene ontology
Molecular function	protein binding; nucleic acid binding
Cellular component	cytoplasm; nuclear speck; catalytic step 2 spliceosome; U2-type post-mRNA release spliceosomal complex; nucleolus; spliceosomal complex; nucleus; nucleoplasm; extracellular matrix
Biological process	RNA processing; protection from non-homologous end joining at telomere; negative regulation of protein-containing complex assembly; biomineral tissue development; mRNA processing; spliceosomal complex disassembly; negative regulation of protein binding; negative regulation of double-strand break repair via nonhomologous end joining; RNA splicing; negative regulation of DNA ligase activity; mRNA splicing, via spliceosome
Sources:Amigo / QuickGO
Orthologs
Databases	NCBI: entry; OMA: entry
Species	Human	Mouse
Entrez	24144	54723
Ensembl	ENSG00000100109	ENSMUSG00000029345
UniProt	Q9UBB9	Q9ERA6
RefSeq (mRNA)	NM_001008697; NM_001346857; NM_001346858; NM_001346859; NM_001346861 NM_001346862; NM_012143	NM_018783
RefSeq (protein)	NP_001008697; NP_001333786; NP_001333787; NP_001333788; NP_001333790 NP_001333791; NP_036275	NP_061253
Location (UCSC)	Chr 22: 26.49 – 26.51 Mb	Chr 5: 112.47 – 112.49 Mb
PubMed search
- Wikidata
View/Edit Human	View/Edit Mouse

Tuftelin-interacting protein 11 is a protein that in humans is encoded by the TFIP11 gene.

== Interactions ==
TFIP11 has been shown to interact with Tuftelin.
