= MMP20 =

Tooth-specific enzyme found in humans

Identifiers
- Aliases: MMP20, AI2A2, MMP-20, matrix metallopeptidase 20
- External IDs: OMIM: 604629; MGI: 1353466; GeneCards: MMP20
Available structures
PDB	Ortholog search: PDBe RCSB
PDB	List of PDB id codes 2JSD

Gene location (Human)
Chr.	Chromosome 11 (human)
Band	11q22.2	Start	102,576,832 bp
Band	11q22.2	End	102,625,332 bp

Gene location (Mouse)
Chr.	Chromosome 9 (mouse)
Band	9|9 A1	Start	7,628,232 bp
Band	9|9 A1	End	7,674,980 bp
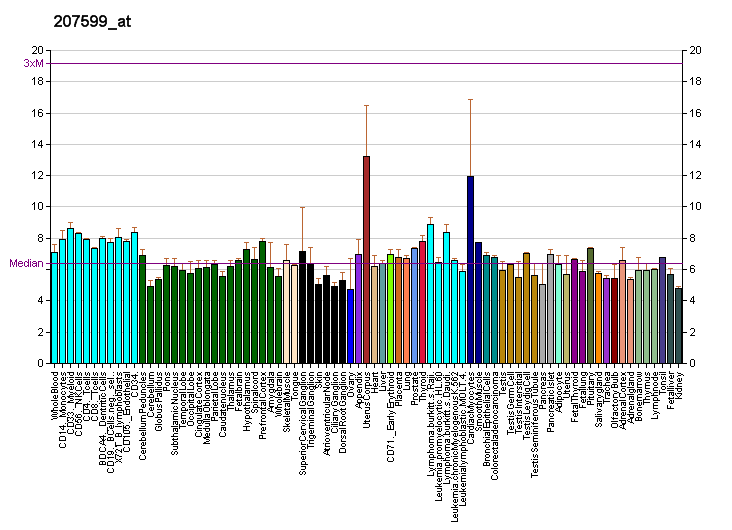
RNA expression pattern
Bgee	Human / Mouse (ortholog); Top expressed in: left testis; right testis; sperm; gonad; sural nerve; gallbladder; duodenum; lymph node; endometrium; salivary gland / Top expressed in: molar; Paneth cell; mandibular molars; tooth germ; enamel organ; jejunum; ileum; More reference expression data
BioGPS	More reference expression data
Gene ontology
Molecular function	zinc ion binding; peptidase activity; metalloendopeptidase activity; protein binding; hydrolase activity; metallopeptidase activity; metal ion binding; serine-type endopeptidase activity
Cellular component	extracellular matrix; extracellular region; extracellular space
Biological process	collagen catabolic process; protein catabolic process; regulation of enamel mineralization; proteolysis; amelogenesis; extracellular matrix disassembly; extracellular matrix organization
Sources:Amigo / QuickGO
Orthologs
Databases	NCBI: entry; OMA: entry
Species	Human	Mouse
Entrez	9313	30800
Ensembl	ENSG00000137674	ENSMUSG00000018620
UniProt	O60882	P57748
RefSeq (mRNA)	NM_004771	NM_013903
RefSeq (protein)	NP_004762	NP_038931
Location (UCSC)	Chr 11: 102.58 – 102.63 Mb	Chr 9: 7.63 – 7.67 Mb
PubMed search
- Wikidata
View/Edit Human	View/Edit Mouse

Matrix metalloproteinase-20 (MMP-20) also known as enamel metalloproteinase or enamelysin is an enzyme that in humans is encoded by the MMP20 gene.

== Function ==
Proteins of the matrix metalloproteinase (MMP) family are involved in the breakdown of extracellular matrix in normal physiological processes, such as embryonic development, reproduction, and tissue remodeling, as well as in disease processes, such as arthritis and metastasis. Most MMP's are secreted as inactive proproteins which are activated when cleaved by extracellular proteinases.

MMP-20, also known as enamelysin, appears to be the only MMP that is tooth-specific and it is expressed by cells of different developmental origin (i.e. epithelial ameloblasts and mesenchymal odontoblasts).

== Clinical significance ==
The human MMP-20 gene contains 10 exons and is part of a cluster of matrix metalloproteinase genes that localize to human chromosome 11q22.3. A mutation in this gene, which alters the normal splice pattern and results in premature termination of the encoded protein, has been associated with amelogenesis imperfecta. Enamel in the absence of MMP-20 is hypoplastic (thin), contains less mineral (only one-third as much total mineral as wild type), and contains more protein and water. In general, MMP-20 functions in enamel are to cleave enamel matrix proteins at specific cleavage sites.
