= WDR72 =

Protein-coding gene in the species Homo sapiens

Identifiers
- Aliases: WDR72, AI2A3, WD repeat domain 72
- External IDs: OMIM: 613214; MGI: 3583957; GeneCards: WDR72

Gene location (Human)
Chr.	Chromosome 15 (human)
Band	15q21.3	Start	53,513,741 bp
Band	15q21.3	End	53,762,878 bp

Gene location (Mouse)
Chr.	Chromosome 9 (mouse)
Band	9|9 D	Start	74,017,638 bp
Band	9|9 D	End	74,190,590 bp
RNA expression pattern
Bgee	Human / Mouse (ortholog); Top expressed in: pancreatic ductal cell; renal medulla; parotid gland; thyroid gland; liver; right lobe of thyroid gland; left lobe of thyroid gland; right lobe of liver; human kidney; skin of thigh / Top expressed in: right kidney; human kidney; renal cortex; proximal tubule; secondary oocyte; morula; zygote; blastocyst; primary oocyte; embryo; More reference expression data
BioGPS	n/a
Orthologs
Databases	NCBI: entry; OMA: entry
Species	Human	Mouse
Entrez	256764	546144
Ensembl	ENSG00000166415	ENSMUSG00000044976
UniProt	Q3MJ13	D3YYM4
RefSeq (mRNA)	NM_001277176; NM_182758	NM_001033500; NM_177908
RefSeq (protein)	NP_001264105; NP_877435	NP_001028672
Location (UCSC)	Chr 15: 53.51 – 53.76 Mb	Chr 9: 74.02 – 74.19 Mb
PubMed search
- Wikidata
View/Edit Human	View/Edit Mouse

WD repeat-containing protein 72 is a protein that in humans is encoded by the WDR72 gene. WDR72 contains 7 WD40 repeats, which are predicted to form the blades of a 7 beta propeller structure.

== Clinical significance ==
Mutations in this gene cause autosomal-recessive hypomaturation amelogenesis imperfecta.
