= Amelogenesis =

Formation of enamel during tooth development

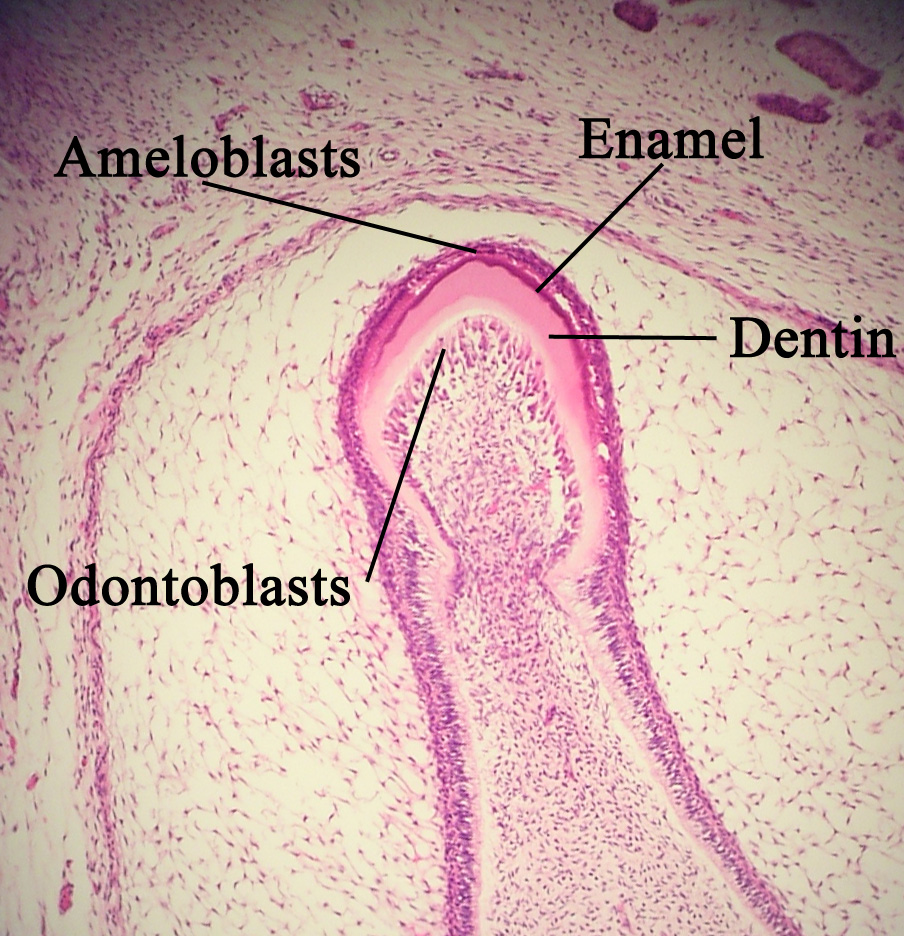

Amelogenesis is the process of forming tooth enamel, the hard, protective outer layer of teeth. This process begins during tooth development after the initial formation of dentin (dentinogenesis), the layer beneath the enamel. The inner enamel epithelium (IEE), a layer of cells within the developing tooth, plays a crucial role by signaling the differentiation of specialized cells called ameloblasts, which then secrete the proteins and minerals that make up enamel. The formation of dentin is essential for amelogenesis to occur, and a reciprocal signaling process between the developing dentin and the IEE-derived ameloblasts ensures the proper coordination of these two crucial stages of tooth development.

== Stages ==
Amelogenesis is considered to have three stages. The first stage is known as the inductive stage, the second is the secretory stage, and the third stage is known as the maturation stage. During the inductive stage, ameloblast differentiation from IEE is initiated. Proteins and an organic matrix form a partially mineralized enamel in the secretory stage. The maturation stage completes enamel mineralization.

=== Inductive (or pre-secretory) stage ===
In the inductive stage, the morphodifferentiation phase the shape of the crown is determined by the bell stage of tooth development. There is a basal lamina between the IEE and the dental papilla. At this time, the dentin is not mineralized. The IEE appear as cuboidal or low columnar cells with centralized nuclei and poorly developed Golgi complexes.

The differentiation phase of the Induction stage is initiated by the presence of newly formed predentin. The IEE cells then elongate and become preameloblasts. There is a shift in polarity. Each preameloblast elongates and becomes an postmitotic, polarized, secretory ameloblast. However, there are no Tomes process yet. It is at this stage that a signal is sent from the newly differentiated ameloblasts back across the dentinoenamel junction (DEJ) to stimulate dentinogenesis.

=== Secretory stage ===
In the secretory stage, ameloblasts are polarized columnar cells. In the rough endoplasmic reticulum of these cells, enamel proteins are released into the surrounding area and contribute to what is known as the enamel matrix, which is then partially mineralized by the enzyme alkaline phosphatase. When this first layer is formed, the ameloblasts move away from the interface with dentin, allowing for the development of Tomes processes at the end of the cell which is in contact with the DEJ. Tomes process is the term given to the end of the cell which lays down the crystals of the enamel matrix. The Tomes processes are angled, which introduces differences in crystallite orientation, and hence structure. Enamel formation continues around the adjoining ameloblasts resulting in a walled area, or pit, that houses a Tomes process, and also around the end of each Tomes process, resulting in a deposition of enamel matrix inside of each pit. The matrix within the pit will eventually become an enamel rod, and the walls will eventually become interrod enamel. The only distinguishing factor between the two is the orientation of the calcium crystals.

=== Maturation stage ===
In the maturation stage, the ameloblasts transport substances used in the formation of enamel. Microscopically, the most notable aspect of this phase is that these cells become striated, or have a ruffled border. These signs demonstrate that the ameloblasts have changed their function from production, as in the secretory stage, to transportation. Proteins used for the mineralization process compose most of the material transported into the matrix, importantly amelogenins, ameloblastins, enamelins, and tuftelins. The Ca2+ mainly comes from the enamel organ, and not the dental papilla, by either passive, extracellular transportation or active, intracellular transportation. The active route is controlled by ameloblasts so the site of mineralization can have a tightly controlled climate, including modulation of proteins that inhibit mineralization (e.g. Serum-derived Albumin) and concentration of ions.

As enamel is secreted, some mineralisation occurs by Ca2+ deposition between nanospheres of amelogenins forming crystallites. Tuftelin also is suggested to have a role in directing the initial deposition.

The undermineralised, immature enamel containing long, thin prisms of hydroxyapatite, now matures. As the prisms in the enamel grow in thickness but not length, proteins (amelogenins and most non-amelogenins) are removed from the matrix to give more space for hydroxyapatite deposition - mature crystals are hexagonal and 25x75nm and can run the whole length of the enamel (up to 2.5mm). The mineralising enamel becomes progressively less porous. During this process, enamelins and tuftelin are left in the enamel (responsible for enamel tufts).

By the end of this stage, the enamel has completed its mineralization. Enamel mineralization only occurs once (as ameloblasts are lost with eruption within the reduced enamel epithelium); therefore after amelogenesis, enamel production has been finalized. This is in contrast to dentin formation which occurs throughout life (secondary dentin production).

== See also ==
- Ameloblast
- Amelogenesis imperfecta
- Human tooth development
- Animal tooth development
- Tooth enamel
