= Tooth enamel =

Major tissue that makes up part of the tooth in humans and many animals

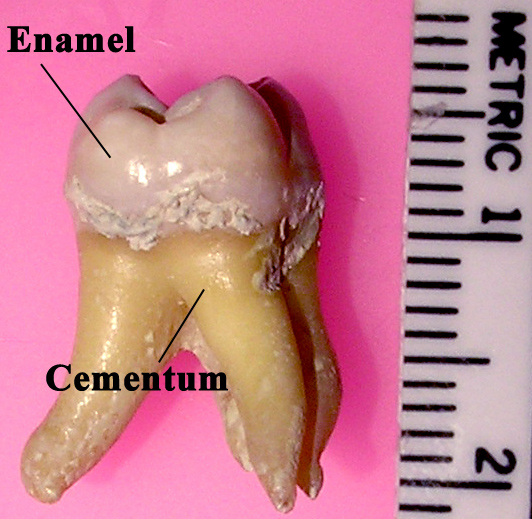
- Labeled molar

Details

Identifiers
- Latin: enamelum
- MeSH: D003743
- TA98: A05.1.03.056
- TA2: 938
- FMA: 55629

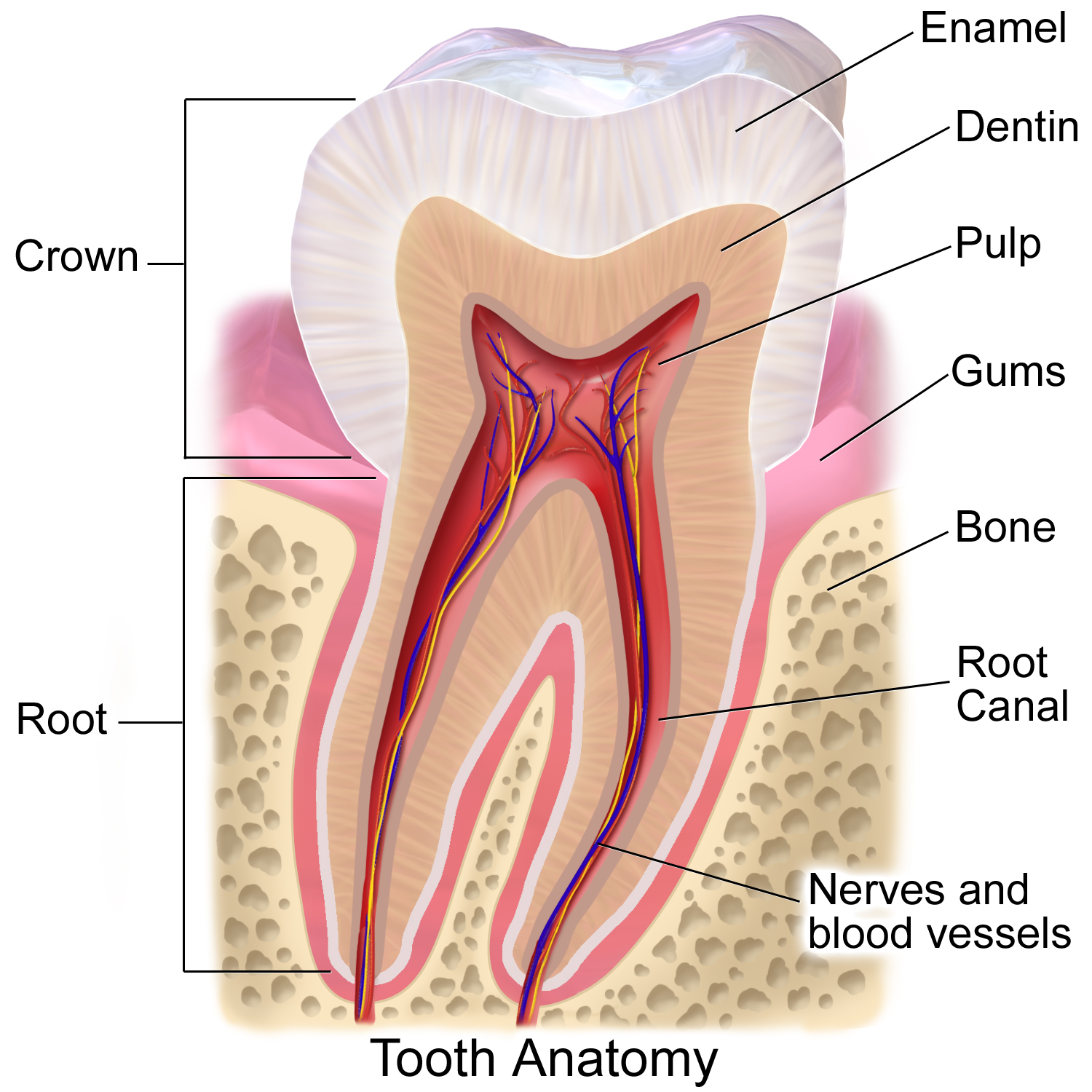
Parts of a tooth, including the enamel (cross section)

Tooth enamel is one of the four major tissues that make up the tooth in humans and many animals, including some species of fish. It makes up the normally visible part of the tooth, covering the crown. The other major tissues are dentin, cementum, and dental pulp. It is a very hard, white to off-white, highly mineralised substance that acts as a barrier to protect the tooth but can become susceptible to degradation, especially by acids from food and drink. In rare circumstances enamel fails to form, leaving the underlying dentin exposed on the surface.

== Features ==
Enamel is the hardest substance in the human body and contains the highest percentage of minerals (at 96%), with water and organic material composing the rest. The primary mineral is hydroxyapatite, which is a crystalline calcium phosphate. Enamel is formed on the tooth while the tooth develops within the jaw bone before it erupts into the mouth. Once fully formed, enamel does not contain blood vessels or nerves, and is not made of cells. Remineralisation of teeth can repair damage to the tooth to a certain degree but damage beyond that cannot be repaired by the body. The maintenance and repair of human tooth enamel is one of the primary concerns of dentistry.

In humans, enamel varies in thickness over the surface of the tooth, often thickest at the cusp, up to 2.5 mm, and thinnest at its border with the cementum at the cementoenamel junction (CEJ).

The normal color of enamel varies from light yellow to grayish (bluish) white. It has been suggested that the color is determined by differences in the translucency of enamel, yellowish teeth having a thin, translucent enamel through which the yellow color of the dentin is visible and grayish teeth having a more opaque enamel. The translucency may be attributable to variations in the degree of calcification and homogeneity of the enamel. At the edges of teeth where there is no dentin underlying the enamel, the color sometimes has a slightly blue or translucent off-white tone, easily observable on the upper incisors. Since enamel is semitranslucent, the color of dentin and any material underneath the enamel strongly affects the appearance of a tooth. The enamel on primary teeth has a more opaque crystalline form and thus appears whiter than on permanent teeth.

The large amount of mineral in enamel accounts not only for its strength but also for its brittleness. Tooth enamel ranks 5 on Mohs hardness scale (between steel and titanium) and has a Young's modulus of 83 GPa. Dentin, less mineralized and less brittle, 3–4 in hardness, compensates for enamel and is necessary as a support. On radiographs, the differences in the mineralization of different portions of the tooth and surrounding periodontium can be noted; enamel appears lighter than dentin or pulp since it is denser than both and more radiopaque.

Enamel does not contain collagen, as found in other hard tissues such as dentin and bone, but it does contain two unique classes of proteins: amelogenins and enamelins. While the role of these proteins is not fully understood, it is believed that they aid in the development of enamel by serving as a framework for minerals to form on, among other functions. Once it is mature, enamel is almost totally without the softer organic matter. Enamel is avascular and has no nerve supply within it and is not renewed, however, it is not a static tissue as it can undergo mineralization changes.

== Structure ==
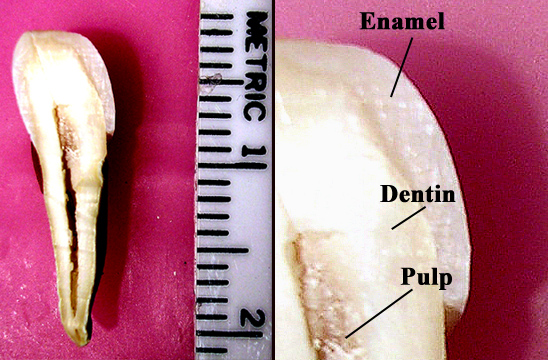

The basic unit of enamel is called an enamel rod. Measuring 4–8 μm in diameter, an enamel rod, formally called an enamel prism, is a tightly packed mass of hydroxyapatite crystallites in an organized pattern. In cross section, it is best compared to a keyhole, with the top, or head, oriented toward the crown of the tooth, and the bottom, or tail, oriented toward the root of the tooth.

The arrangement of the crystallites within each enamel rod is highly complex. Both ameloblasts (the cells which initiate enamel formation) and Tomes's processes affect the crystallites' pattern. Enamel crystallites in the head of the enamel rod are oriented parallel to the long axis of the rod. When found in the tail of the enamel rod, the crystallites' orientation diverges slightly (65 degrees) from the long axis.

The arrangement of enamel rods is understood more clearly than their internal structure. Enamel rods are found in rows along the tooth, and within each row, the long axis of the enamel rod is generally perpendicular to the underlying dentin. In permanent teeth, the enamel rods near the cementoenamel junction (CEJ) tilt slightly toward the root of the tooth. Understanding enamel orientation is very important in restorative dentistry, because enamel unsupported by underlying dentin is prone to fracture.

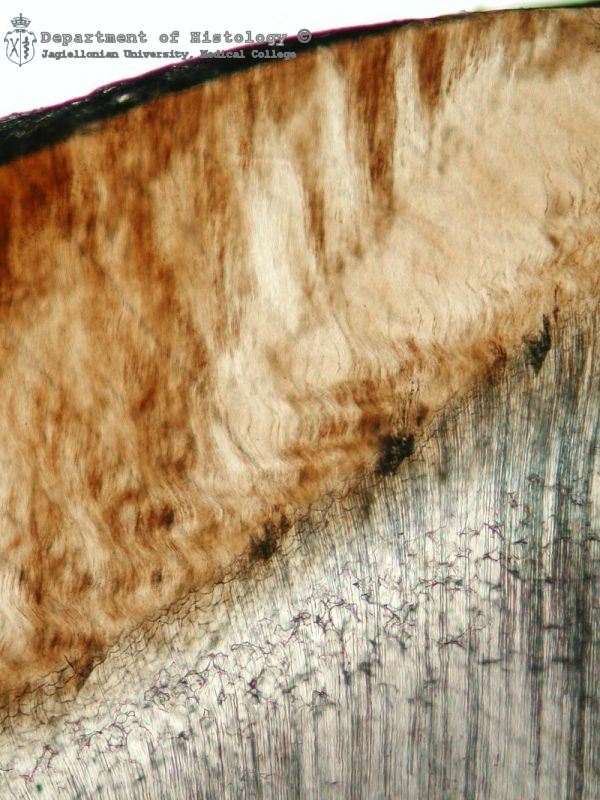

The area around the enamel rod is known as interrod enamel. Interrod enamel has the same composition as enamel rod, however a histologic distinction is made between the two because crystallite orientation is different in each. The border where the crystallites of enamel rods and crystallites of interrod enamel meet is called the rod sheath.

Striae of Retzius are incremental lines that appear brown in a stained section of mature enamel. These lines are composed of bands or cross striations on the enamel rods that, when combined in longitudinal sections, seem to traverse the enamel rods. Formed from changes in diameter of Tomes' processes, these incremental lines demonstrate the growth of enamel, similar to the annual rings on a tree on transverse sections of enamel. The exact mechanism that produces these lines is still being debated. Some researchers hypothesize that the lines are a result of the diurnal (circadian), or 24-hour, metabolic rhythm of the ameloblasts producing the enamel matrix, which consists of an active secretory work period followed by an inactive rest period during tooth development. Thus, each band on the enamel rod demonstrates the work/rest pattern of the ameloblasts that generally occurs over a span of a week.

Perikymata which are associated with the Striae are shallow grooves noted clinically on the nonmasticatory surfaces of some teeth in the oral cavity. Perikymata are usually lost through tooth wear, except on the protected cervical regions of some teeth, especially the permanent maxillary central incisors, canines, and first premolars, and may be confused as dental calculus. Darker than the other incremental lines, the neonatal line is an incremental line that separates enamel formed before and after birth. The neonatal line marks the stress or trauma experienced by the ameloblasts during birth, again illustrating the sensitivity of the ameloblasts as they form enamel matrix. As one would expect, the neonatal line is found in all primary teeth and in the larger cusps of the permanent first molars. They contain irregular structures of enamel prisms with disordered crystallite arrangements basically formed by the abrupt bending of the prisms towards the root; usually, the prisms gradually bent back again to regain their previous orientation.

Gnarled enamel is found at the cusps of teeth. Its twisted appearance results from the orientation of enamel rods and the rows in which they lie.

== Development ==
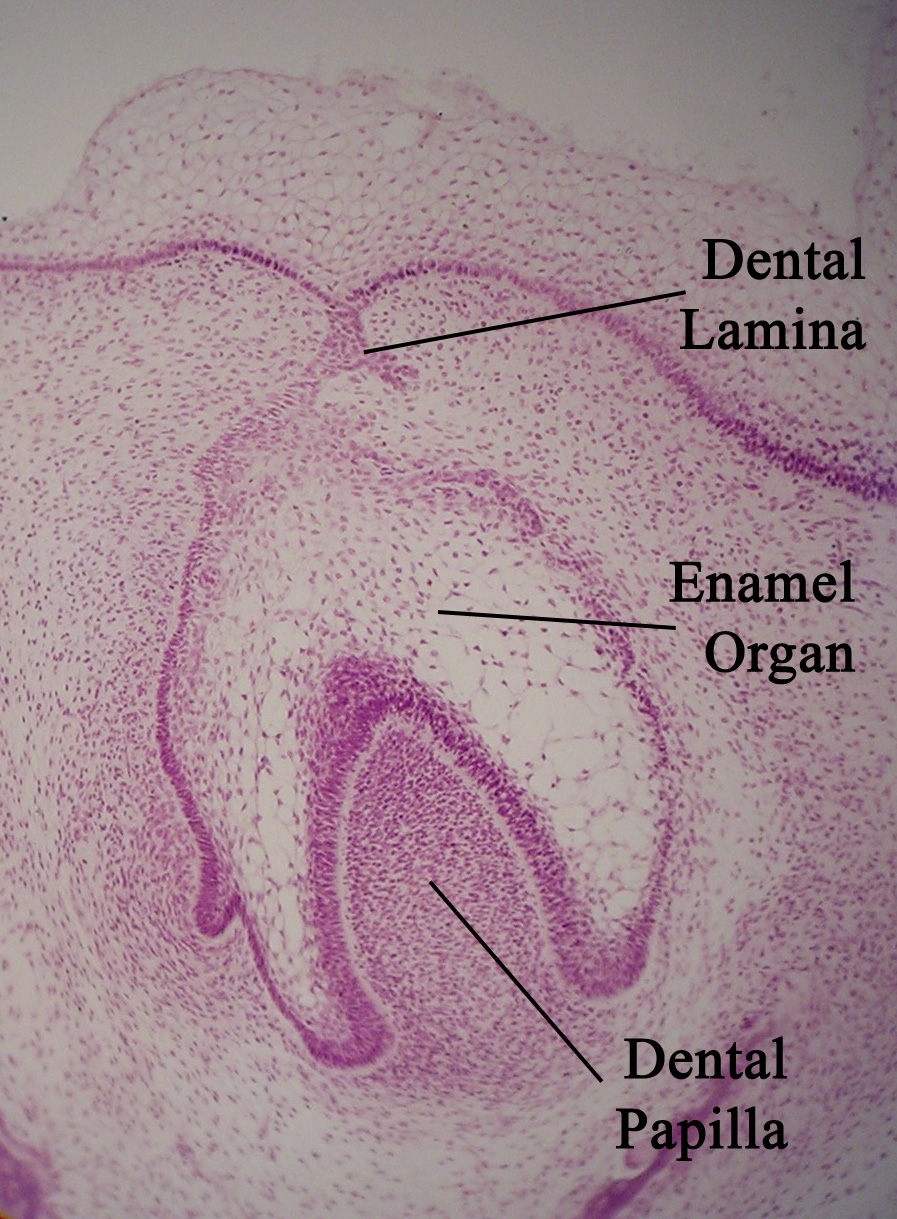
Histologic slide showing a developing tooth. The mouth would be in the area of space at the top of the picture.

Enamel formation is part of the overall process of tooth development. Under a microscope, different cellular aggregations are identifiable within the tissues of a developing tooth, including structures known as the enamel organ, dental lamina, and dental papilla. The generally recognized stages of tooth development are the bud stage, cap stage, bell stage, and crown, or calcification, stage. Enamel formation is first seen in the crown stage.

Amelogenesis, or enamel formation, occurs after the first establishment of dentin, via cells known as ameloblasts. Human enamel forms at a rate of around 4 μm per day, beginning at the future location of cusps, around the third or fourth month of pregnancy. As in all human processes, the creation of enamel is complex, but can generally be divided into two stages. The first stage, called the secretory stage, involves proteins and an organic matrix forming a partially mineralized enamel. The second stage, called the maturation stage, completes enamel mineralization.

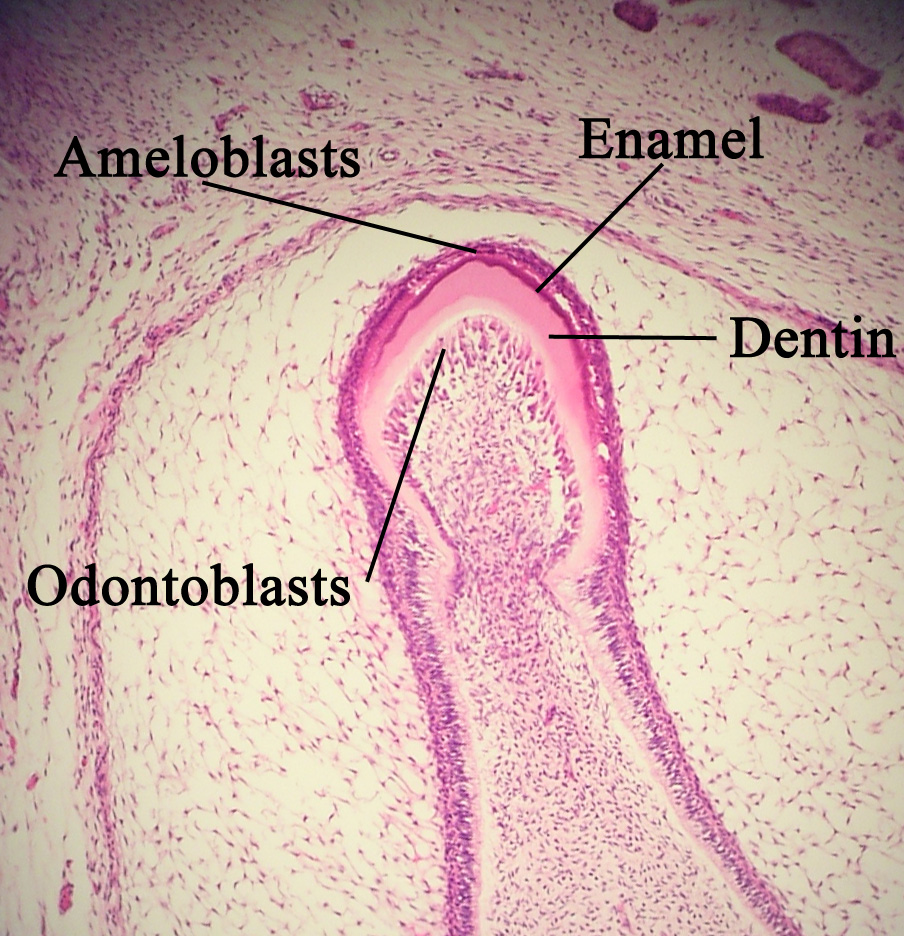
Histologic slide showing enamel formation

In the secretory stage, ameloblasts are polarized columnar cells. In the rough endoplasmic reticulum of these cells, enamel proteins are released into the surrounding area and contribute to what is known as the enamel matrix, which is then partially mineralized by the enzyme alkaline phosphatase. When this first layer is formed, the ameloblasts move away from the dentin, allowing for the development of Tomes' processes at the apical pole of the cell. Enamel formation continues around the adjoining ameloblasts, resulting in a walled area, or pit, that houses a Tomes' process, and also around the end of each Tomes' process, resulting in a deposition of enamel matrix inside of each pit. The matrix within the pit will eventually become an enamel rod, and the walls will eventually become interrod enamel. The only distinguishing factor between the two is the orientation of the calcium phosphate crystallites.

In the maturation stage, the ameloblasts transport substances used in the formation of enamel. Histologically, the most notable aspect of this phase is that these cells become striated, or have a ruffled border. These signs demonstrate that the ameloblasts have changed their function from production, as in the secretory stage, to transportation. Proteins used for the final mineralization process compose most of the transported material. The noteworthy proteins involved are amelogenins, ameloblastins, enamelins, and tuftelins. How these proteins are secreted into the enamel structure is still unknown; other proteins, such as the Wnt signaling components BCL9 and Pygopus, have been implicated in this process. During this process, amelogenins and ameloblastins are removed after use, leaving enamelins and tuftelin in the enamel. By the end of this stage, the enamel has completed its mineralization.

At some point before the tooth erupts into the mouth, but after the maturation stage, the ameloblasts are broken down. Consequently, enamel, unlike many other tissues of the body, has no way to regenerate itself. After destruction of enamel from decay or injury, neither the body nor a dentist can restore the enamel tissue. Enamel can be affected further by non-pathologic processes.

Enamel is covered by various structures in relation to the development of tooth:

- Nasmyth membrane or enamel cuticle, structure of embryological origin is composed of keratin which gives rise to the enamel organ.
- Acquired pellicle, structure acquired after tooth eruption is composed of food debris, calculus, dental plaque (organic film).

Progress of enamel formation for primary teeth
| | | Amount of enamel formed at birth | Enamel mineralization completed |
| Primary maxillary tooth | Central incisor | 5/6 | 1.5 months after birth |
| Primary maxillary tooth | Lateral incisor | 2/3 | 2.5 months after birth |
| Primary maxillary tooth | Canine | 1/3 | 9 months after birth |
| Primary maxillary tooth | 1st molar | Cusps united; occlusal completely calcified and 1/2 to 3/4 crown height | 6 months after birth |
| Primary maxillary tooth | 2nd molar | Cusps united; occlusal incompletely calcified; calcified tissue covers 1/5 to 1/4 crown height | 11 months after birth |
| Primary mandibular tooth | Central incisor | 3/5 | 2.5 months after birth |
| Primary mandibular tooth | Lateral incisor | 3/5 | 3 months after birth |
| Primary mandibular tooth | Canine | 1/3 | 9 months after birth |
| Primary mandibular tooth | 1st molar | Cusps united; occlusal completely calcified | 5.5 months after birth |
| Primary mandibular tooth | 2nd molar | Cusps united; occlusal incompletely calcified | 10 months after birth |

== Enamel loss ==
The high mineral content of enamel, which makes this tissue the hardest in the human body, also makes it demineralize in a process that often occurs as dental caries, otherwise known as cavities. Demineralization occurs for several reasons, but the most important cause of tooth decay is the ingestion of fermentable carbohydrates. Tooth cavities are caused when acids dissolve tooth enamel: Enamel is also lost through tooth wear and enamel fractures.

Ca_{10}(PO_{4})_{6}(OH)_{2}_{(s)} + 8H^{+}_{(aq)} → 10Ca^{2+}_{(aq)} + 6HPO^{2−}_{4}_{(aq)} + 2 H_{2}O

Sugars and acids from candies, soft drinks, and fruit juices play a significant role in tooth decay, and consequently in enamel destruction. The mouth contains a great number and variety of bacteria, and when sucrose, the most common of sugars, coats the surface of the mouth, some intraoral bacteria interact with it and form lactic acid, which decreases the pH in the mouth. The critical pH for tooth enamel is generally accepted to be pH 5.5. When acids are present and the critical pH is reached, the hydroxyapatite crystallites of enamel demineralize, allowing for greater bacterial invasion deeper into the tooth. The most important bacterium involved with tooth decay is Streptococcus mutans, but the number and type of bacteria varies with the progress of tooth destruction.

Furthermore, tooth morphology dictates that the most common site for the initiation of dental caries is in the deep grooves, pits, and fissures of enamel. This is expected because these locations are impossible to reach with a toothbrush and allow for bacteria to reside there. When demineralization of enamel occurs, a dentist can use a sharp instrument, such as a dental explorer, and "feel a stick" at the location of the decay. As enamel continues to become less mineralized and is unable to prevent the encroachment of bacteria, the underlying dentin becomes affected as well. When dentin, which normally supports enamel, is destroyed by a physiologic condition or by decay, enamel is unable to compensate for its brittleness and breaks away from the tooth easily.

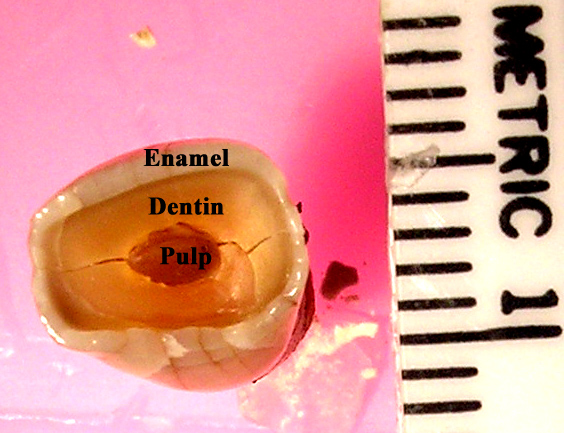
The effects of bruxism on an anterior tooth, revealing the dentin and pulp which are normally hidden by enamel

The extent to which tooth decay is likely, known as cariogenicity, depends on factors such as how long the sugar remains in the mouth. Contrary to common belief, it is not the amount of sugar ingested but the frequency of sugar ingestion that is the most important factor in the causation of tooth decay. When the pH in the mouth initially decreases from the ingestion of sugars, the enamel is demineralized and left vulnerable for about 30 minutes. Eating a greater quantity of sugar in one sitting does not increase the time of demineralization. Similarly, eating a lesser quantity of sugar in one sitting does not decrease the time of demineralization. Thus, eating a great quantity of sugar at one time in the day is less detrimental than is a very small quantity ingested in many intervals throughout the day. For example, in terms of oral health, it is better to eat a single dessert at dinner time than to snack on a bag of candy throughout the day.

The resulting cavities can vary in color from yellow to black. Tooth regeneration is an area of ongoing stem cell-based research aimed at finding methods to reverse the effects of tooth decay; existing treatments are limited to managing the symptoms. Therefore, regular dental check-ups are recommended. These examinations help identify potential carious lesions and allow the dentist to prevent problems before they worsen.

In addition to bacterial invasion, enamel is also susceptible to other destructive forces. Bruxism, also known as clenching of or grinding on teeth, destroys enamel very quickly. The wear rate of enamel, called attrition, is 8 μm a year from normal factors. A common misconception is that enamel wears away mostly from chewing, but actually teeth rarely touch during chewing. Furthermore, normal tooth contact is compensated physiologically by the periodontal ligaments and the arrangement of dental occlusion. The truly destructive forces are the parafunctional movements, as found in bruxism, which can cause irreversible damage to the enamel.

Other nonbacterial processes of enamel destruction include abrasion (involving foreign elements, such as toothbrushes), erosion (involving chemical processes, such as dissolving by soft drinks or lemon and other juices), and possibly abfraction (involving compressive and tensile forces).

Though enamel is described as tough, it has a similar brittleness to glass, making it, unlike other natural crack-resistant laminate structures such as shell and nacre, vulnerable to fracture. In spite of this it can withstand bite forces as high as 1,000 N (220 lbf) many times a day during chewing. This resistance is due in part to the microstructure of enamel which contains enamel tufts that stabilize such fractures at the dentinoenamel junction. The configuration of the tooth also acts to reduce the tensile stresses that cause fractures during biting.

Gastroesophageal reflux disease can also lead to enamel loss, as acid refluxes up the esophagus and into the mouth, occurring most during overnight sleep.

=== Oral hygiene ===
Because enamel is vulnerable to demineralization, prevention of tooth decay is the best way to maintain the health of teeth. Most countries have wide use of toothbrushes, which can reduce the number of dental biofilm and food particles on enamel. In isolated societies that do not have access to toothbrushes, it is common for those people to use other objects, such as sticks, to clean their teeth. In between two adjacent teeth, floss is used to wipe the enamel surfaces free of plaque and food particles to discourage bacterial growth. Although neither floss nor toothbrushes can penetrate the deep grooves and pits of enamel, good general oral-health habits can usually prevent enough bacterial growth to keep tooth decay from starting. Structural integrity of the enamel is genetic, and so is its predisposition to demineralization or attack from bacteria.

=== Fluoride remineralization ===
Effect of fluoridation on hydroxyapatite in tooth enamel

Fluoride catalyzes the diffusion of calcium and phosphate into the tooth surface, which in turn remineralizes the crystalline structures in a dental cavity. The remineralized tooth surfaces contain fluoridated hydroxyapatite and fluorapatite, which resist acid attack much better than the original tooth did. Fluoride therapy is used to help prevent dental decay.

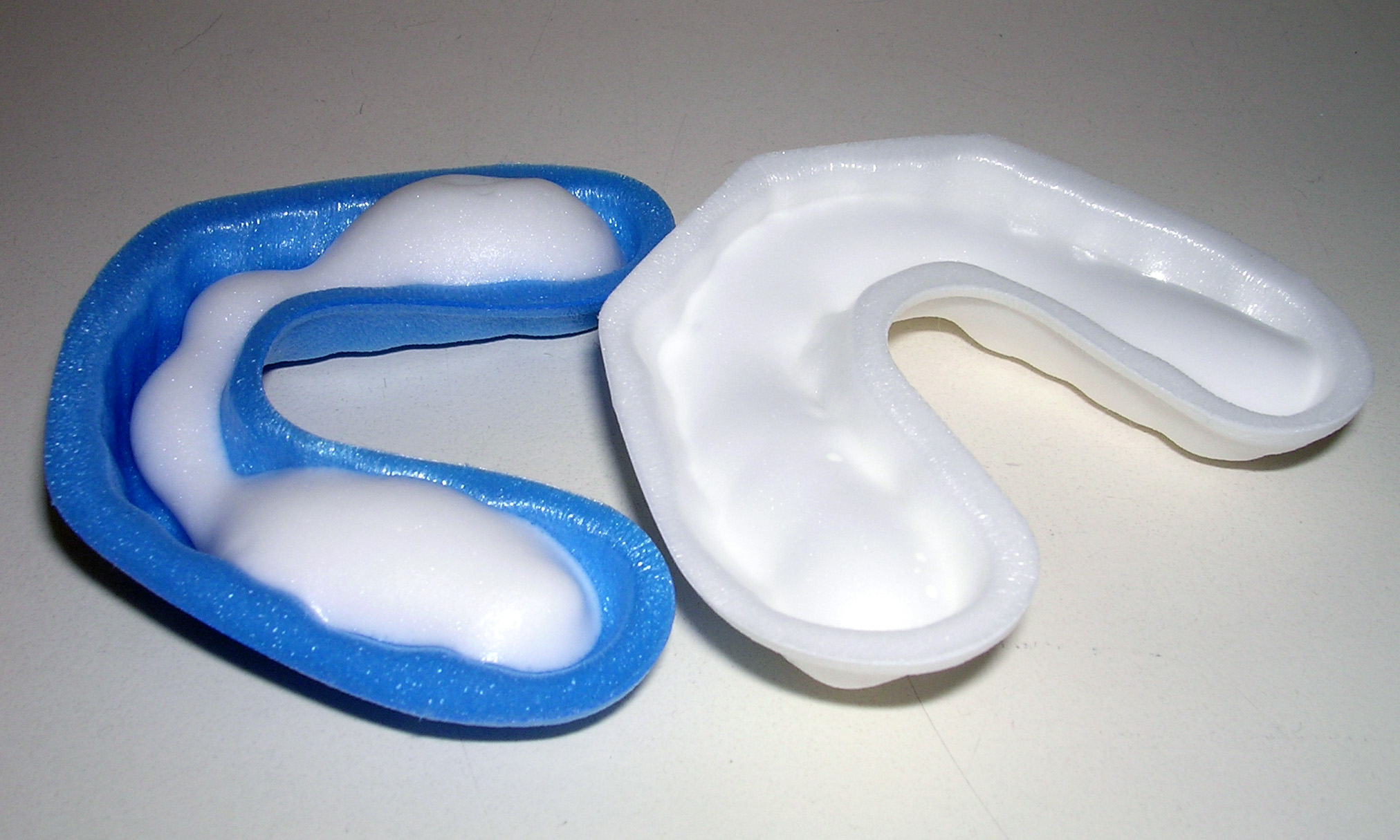
Common dentistry trays filled with fluoride foam

==== Fluoride in drinking water ====
Most dental professionals and organizations agree that the inclusion of fluoride in public water has been one of the most effective methods of decreasing the prevalence of tooth decay. Fluoride can be found in many locations naturally, such as the ocean and other water sources. The recommended dosage of fluoride in drinking water does not depend on air temperature.

Some groups have spoken out against fluoridated drinking water, for reasons such as the neurotoxicity of fluoride or the damage fluoride can do as fluorosis. Fluorosis is a condition resulting from the overexposure to fluoride, especially between the ages of 6 months and 5 years, and appears as mottled enamel. Consequently, the teeth look unsightly, although the incidence of dental decay in those teeth is very small. Where fluoride is found naturally in high concentrations, filters are often used to decrease the amount of fluoride in water. For this reason, codes have been developed by dental professionals to limit the amount of fluoride a person should take. These codes are supported by the American Dental Association and the American Academy of Pediatric Dentistry.

Topical fluoride, found in toothpaste and mouthwashes, does not cause fluorosis, and its effects are now considered more important than those of systemic fluoride, such as that absorbed when drinking fluoridated water or taking fluoride supplement pills. Systemic fluoride works topically as well since fluoride levels in saliva increase when fluoridated water is consumed.

== Dental procedures ==
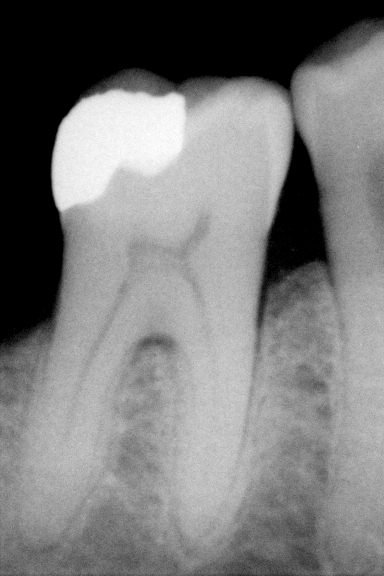
An X-ray showing enamel and dentin replaced by an amalgam restoration

=== Dental restorations ===
Most dental restorations involve the removal of enamel. Frequently, the purpose of removal is to gain access to the underlying decay in the dentin or inflammation in the pulp. This is typically the case in amalgam restorations and endodontic treatment.

Nonetheless, enamel can sometimes be removed before there is any decay present. The most popular example is the dental sealant. In the past, the process of placing dental sealants involved removing enamel in the deep fissures and grooves of a tooth, followed by replacing it with a restorative material. Presently, it is more common to only remove decayed enamel if present. In spite of this, there are still cases where deep fissures and grooves in enamel are removed in order to prevent decay, and a sealant may or may not be placed depending on the situation. Sealants are unique in that they are preventative restorations for protection from future decay, and have been shown to reduce the risk of decay by 55% over 7 years.

Aesthetics is another reason for the removal of enamel. Removing enamel is necessary when placing crowns and veneers to enhance the appearance of teeth. In both of these instances, when unsupported by underlying dentin, that portion of the enamel is more vulnerable to fracture.

=== Acid-etching techniques ===
Invented in 1955, acid-etching employs dental etchants and is used frequently when bonding dental restoration to teeth. This is important for long-term use of some materials, such as composites and sealants. By dissolving minerals in enamel, etchants remove the outer 10 micrometers on the enamel surface and make a porous layer 5–50 micrometers deep. This roughens the enamel microscopically and results in a greater surface area on which to bond.

The effects of acid-etching on enamel can vary. Important variables are the amount of time the etchant is applied, the type of etchant used, and the current condition of the enamel.

There are three types of patterns formed by acid-etching. Type 1 is a pattern where predominantly the enamel rods are dissolved; type 2 is a pattern where predominantly the area around the enamel rods are dissolved; and type 3 is a pattern where there is no evidence left of any enamel rods. Besides concluding that type 1 is the most favorable pattern and type 3 the least, the explanation for these different patterns is not known for certain but is most commonly attributed to different crystallite orientation in the enamel.

=== Tooth whitening ===
The discoloration of teeth over time can result from exposure to substances such as tobacco, coffee, and tea. The staining occurs in the interprismatic region internally on the enamel, which causes the tooth to appear darker or more yellow overall. In a perfect state, enamel is colorless, but it does reflect underlying tooth structure with its stains since light reflection properties of the tooth are low.

Tooth whitening or tooth bleaching procedures attempt to lighten a tooth's color in either of two ways: by chemical or mechanical action. Working chemically, a bleaching agent is used to carry out an oxidation reaction in the enamel and dentin. The agents most commonly used to intrinsically change the color of teeth are hydrogen peroxide and carbamide peroxide. Oxygen radicals from the peroxide in the whitening agents contact the stains in the interprismatic spaces within the enamel layer. When this occurs, stains will be bleached and the teeth now appear lighter in color. Teeth not only appear whiter but also reflect light in increased amounts, which makes the teeth appear brighter as well. Studies show that whitening does not produce any ultrastructural or microhardness changes in the dental tissues.

Studies show that patients who have whitened their teeth take better care of them. However, a tooth whitening product with an overall low pH can put enamel at risk for decay or destruction by demineralization. Consequently, care should be taken and risk evaluated when choosing a product which is very acidic. Tooth whiteners in toothpastes work through a mechanical action. They have mild abrasives which aid in the removal of stains on enamel. Although this can be an effective method, it does not alter the intrinsic color of teeth. Microabrasion techniques employ both methods. An acid is used first to weaken the outer 22–27 micrometers of enamel in order to weaken it enough for the subsequent abrasive force. This allows for removal of superficial stains in the enamel. If the discoloration is deeper or in the dentin, this method of tooth whitening will not be successful.

== Related pathology ==
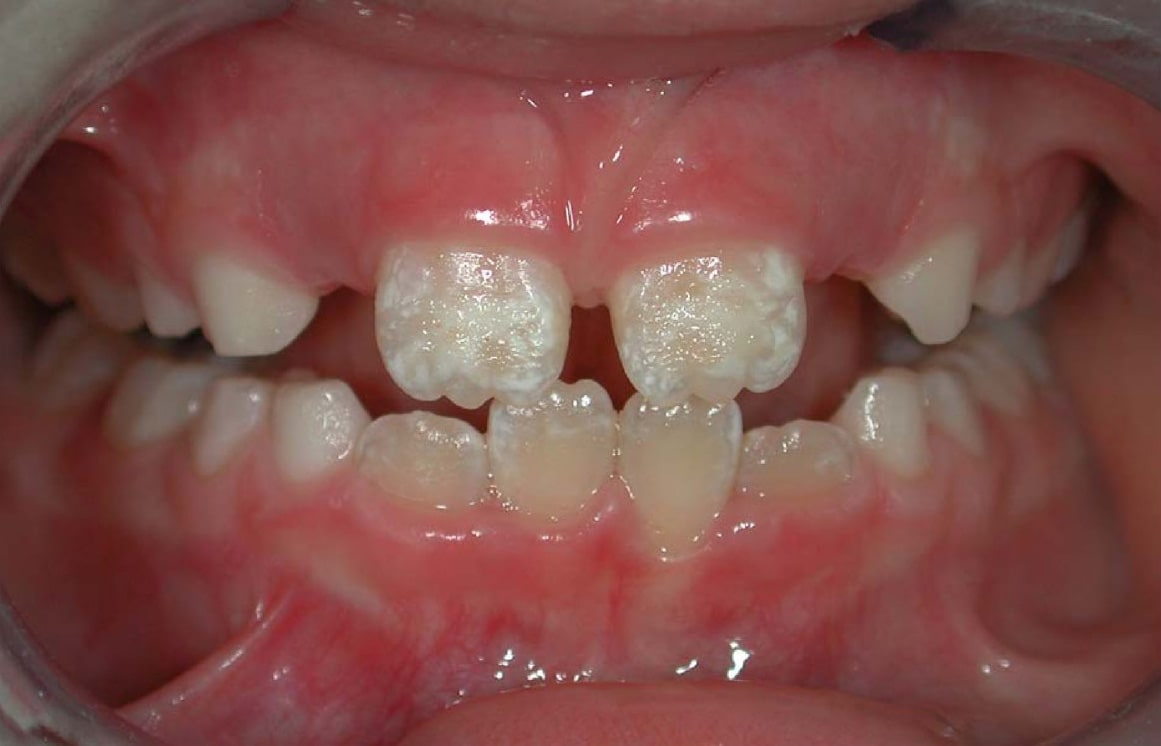
Irreversible enamel defects caused by an untreated celiac disease. They may be the only clue to its diagnosis, even in absence of gastrointestinal symptoms, but are often confused with fluorosis, tetracycline discoloration, or other causes. The National Institutes of Health include a dental exam in the diagnostic protocol of celiac disease.

There are 14 different types of amelogenesis imperfecta. The hypocalcification type, which is the most common, is an autosomal dominant condition that results in enamel that is not completely mineralized. Consequently, enamel easily flakes off the teeth, which appear yellow because of the revealed dentin. The hypoplastic type is X-linked and results in normal enamel that appears in too little quantity, having the same effect as the most common type.

Chronic bilirubin encephalopathy, which can result from erythroblastosis fetalis, is a disease which has numerous effects on an infant, but it can also cause enamel hypoplasia and green staining of enamel.

Enamel hypoplasia is broadly defined to encompass all deviations from normal enamel in its various degrees of absence. The missing enamel could be localized, forming a small pit, or it could be completely absent.

Erythropoietic porphyria is a genetic disease resulting in the deposition of porphyrins throughout the body. These deposits also occur in enamel and leave an appearance described as red in color and fluorescent.

Fluorosis leads to mottled enamel and occurs from overexposure to fluoride.

Tetracycline staining leads to brown bands on the areas of developing enamel. Children up to age 8 can develop mottled enamel from taking tetracycline. As a result, tetracycline is contraindicated in pregnant women.

Celiac disease, a disorder characterized by an auto-immune response to gluten, also commonly results in hypomineralization of the enamel.

== Other mammals ==
For the most part, research has shown that the formation of tooth enamel in animals is almost identical to formation in humans. The enamel organ, including the dental papilla, and ameloblasts function similarly. The variations of enamel that are present are infrequent but sometimes important. Differences exist, certainly, in the morphology, number, and types of teeth among animals.

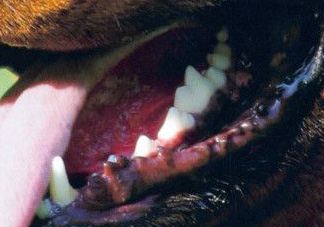
Teeth of a rottweiler

Dogs are less likely than humans to have tooth decay due to the high pH of dog saliva, which prevents an acidic environment from forming and the subsequent demineralization of enamel which would occur. If tooth decay does occur (usually from trauma), dogs can receive dental fillings just as humans do. Similar to human teeth, the enamel of dogs is vulnerable to tetracycline staining. Consequently, this risk must be accounted for when tetracycline antibiotic therapy is administered to young dogs. Enamel hypoplasia may also occur in dogs.

The mineral distribution in rodent enamel is different from that of monkeys, dogs, pigs, and humans. In horse teeth, the enamel and dentin layers are intertwined with each other, which increases the strength and wear resistance of those teeth.

== Other organisms ==
Enamel or enameloid is found in the dermal denticles of sharks and many early vertebrates, and it appeared there before gnathostome teeth evolved. The ganoin that covers the scales of many actinopterygians is probably derived from enamel. Enamel-like substances also coat the jaws of some crustacea, but this is not homologous with vertebrate enamel. Enameloid covers some fish scales.

== Mechanical properties ==
Due to the unique structure of enamel, the mechanical properties are very interesting. Enamel is the hardest material in the body and is one of the most durable load-bearing biological materials. It has been shown to have a fracture toughness three times greater than that of geological hydroxyapatite, the main mineral in enamel.

Consisting of rod and interrod regions within the microstructure of enamel, the mechanical properties of enamel vary depending on the location within the microstructure. The rod and interrod structure causes anisotropy in enamel as both components have different mechanical properties. The interrod enamel has around 53% and 74% decreased hardness and elastic modulus when compared to the rod structures. This leads to a composite like hierarchical structure of enamel. The hardness and stiffness parallel to the rod axis results in high hardness and modulus, shown to have modulus values of 85–90 GPa (12.3–13.1 million pounds per square inch) and hardness values of 3.4–3.9 GPa (490–570 thousand pounds per square inch). The hardness and modulus in the direction perpendicular to the rod directions are lower values, shown to have an elastic modulus between 70 and 77 GPa (10.2 and 11.2 million pounds per square inch) and a hardness value of 3.0–3.5 GPa (440–510 thousand pounds per square inch). The anisotropy between the two directions can be as high as 30%. This is due partially to the structure of the material and the directionality of the rods in the c-direction. The structure of enamel is also composite in nature between the interrod and rods which also leads to anisotropy. Single crystallite hydroxyapatite, the mineral enamel is based on, is also anisotropic. Single crystallite hydroxyapatite has a higher hardness and young's modulus, which may be due to the defects present in enamel, such as substitutional ions as well as the presence of organic materials.

The mechanical properties of enamel not only are anisotropic due to the structure of the rods and interrods. They are also varying across the length of enamel from the enamel at the surface of the tooth, the outer enamel, to the junction between the dentin and enamel, DEJ. The elastic modulus increases as the distance between the dentin-enamel junction (DEJ) increases within enamel. The fracture toughness is also anisotropic. The fracture toughness can vary by up to a factor of three due to the orientation of the rods. Also in enamel, Cracks do not easily penetrate the dentin, which may lead to the higher fracture toughness. Overall, enamel is a highly anisotropic material due to its microstructure, which leads to properties needed for the effective use of our teeth.

== See also ==
- Ameloblast
- Odontoblast
- Amorphous calcium phosphate
- Dental caries
- Ivory
- Tooth development
