= Ameloblast =

Cells which deposit enamel during tooth development

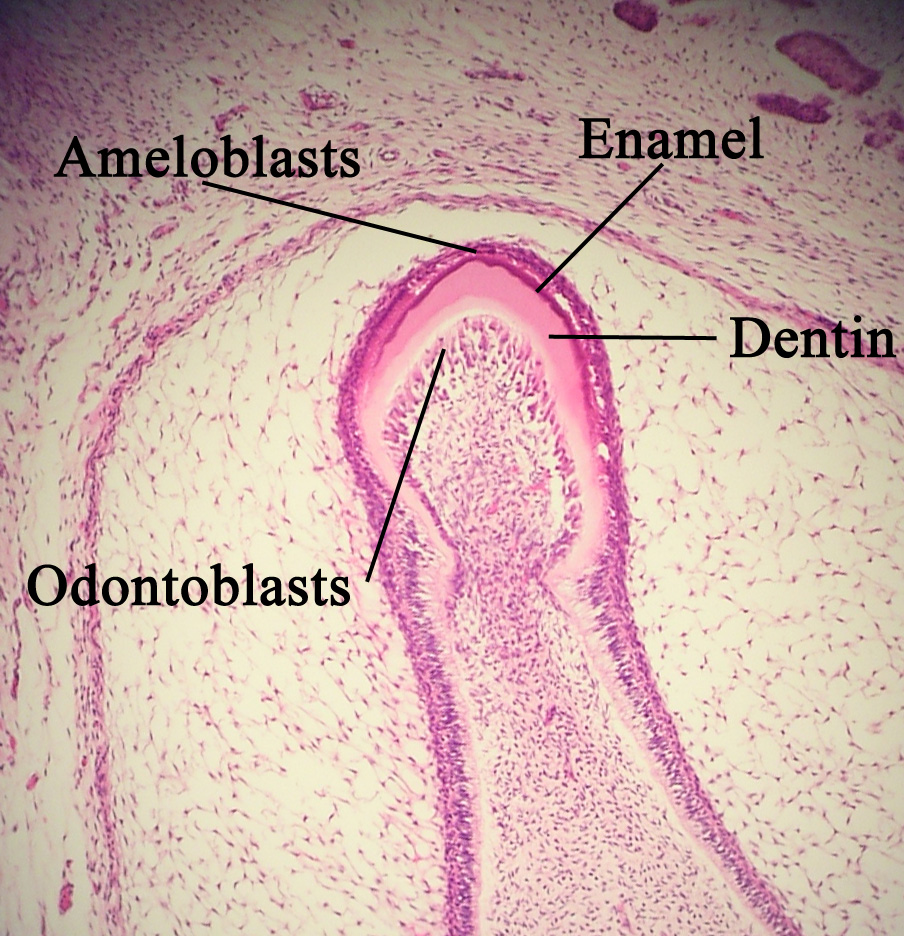
- A developing tooth with ameloblasts marked.

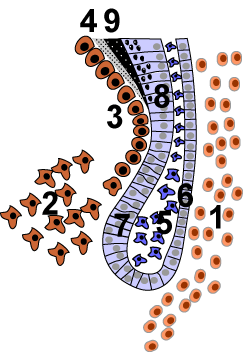
- The cervical loop area: (1) dental follicle cells, (2) dental mesenchyme, (3) odontoblasts, (4) dentin, (5) stellate reticulum, (6) outer enamel epithelium, (7) inner enamel epithelium, (8) ameloblasts, (9) enamel.

Details

Identifiers
- Latin: ameloblastus
- MeSH: D000565
- TE: E5.4.1.1.2.3.20
- FMA: 70576

Ameloblasts are cells present only during tooth development that deposit tooth enamel, which is the hard outermost layer of the tooth forming the surface of the crown.

== Structure ==
Each ameloblast is a columnar cell approximately 4 micrometers in diameter, 40 micrometers in length and is hexagonal in cross section. The secretory end of the ameloblast ends in a six-sided pyramid-like projection known as the Tomes' process. The angulation of the Tomes' process is significant in the orientation of enamel rods, the basic unit of tooth enamel. Distal terminal bars are junctional complexes that separate the Tomes' processes from ameloblast proper.

== Development ==
Ameloblasts are derived from oral epithelium tissue of ectodermal origin. Their differentiation from preameloblasts (whose origin is from inner enamel epithelium) is a result of signaling from the ectomesenchymal cells of the dental papilla. Initially the preameloblasts will differentiate into presecretory ameloblasts and then into secretory ameloblasts which lay down the tooth enamel. The differentiation from preameloblasts to ameloblasts occurs during the first stage of amelogenesis, called the pre-secretory (or inductive) phase.

The ameloblasts will only become fully functional after the first layer of dentin (predentin) has been formed by odontoblasts. The cells are part of the reduced enamel epithelium after enamel maturation and then subsequently undergo apoptosis before or after tooth eruption. These stages occur during the third and final stage of amelogenesis, called the maturation phase.

There are various factors which can affect the differentiation and development of ameloblasts, causing abnormalities to form within the tooth structure. One example is the BMP (bone morphogenetic protein,) which has an important role in ameloblast differentiation. When follistatin, a BMP inhibitor, is over expressed in the epithelium of developing teeth, the ameloblasts do not differentiate and no enamel forms. Another example includes the conditional deletion of dicer-1 in the epithelium of developing teeth, which may cause impaired differentiation of ameloblasts resulting in deficient enamel formation.

=== Life cycle ===
The life cycle of ameloblasts consists of six stages:

1. Morphogenic stage
2. Organizing stage
3. Formative (secretory) stage (Tomes' processes appear)
4. Maturative stages
5. Protective stage
6. Desmolytic stage
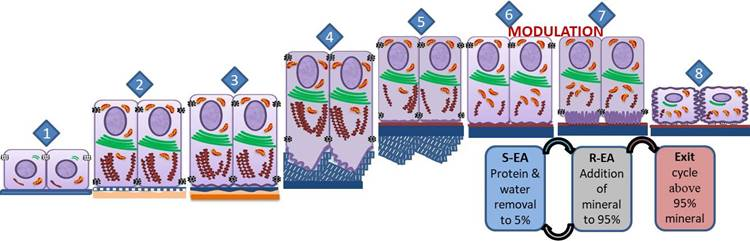
  Ameloblast life cycle & Amelogenesis

The murine ALC (ameloblast like cell) cell line is of ameloblastic origin.

==== 1. Morphogenic stage ====
In this morphogenic stage, the morphology of the cells are short, columnar with large oval nuclei. The golgi apparatus and centrioles are located in the proximal end of the ameloblasts, and mitochondria are dispersed throughout the cytoplasm.

==== 2. Organizing stage ====
In this stage, the ameloblast cells become longer and the nucleus migrates towards the proximal end. In contrast to this, the Golgi apparatus and centrioles migrate towards the distal end. This change is referred to as "reversal of polarity". During this stage, the odontoblasts start laying down dentin.

Reversal of nutrition - as long as the ameloblasts are in contact with the dental papilla, they receive nutrient material from the blood vessels of the tissue, but due to formation of this dentin the original source of nutrition is cut off and the ameloblasts are supplied by capillaries penetrating the outer enamel epithelium. This change in nutrition source is referred to as "reversal of nutrition".

==== 3. Formative stage ====
In this stage, formation of enamel matrix begins. During the formation of enamel matrix, the ameloblasts retain approximately the same length.

==== 4. Maturative stage ====
After the formation of enamel matrix, mineralisation of enamel takes place which is known as maturation. During this stage, the ameloblasts are slightly reduced in length. The stratum intermedium cells lose their cuboidal shape and assumed to be as spindle shape. During this stage, ameloblasts also exhibit microvilli at their distal extremities.

==== 5. Protective stage ====
In this stage, enamel is completely developed and fully calcified. Now the cell layers form a stratified epithelial covering of enamel, which is known as reduced enamel epithelium. This reduced enamel epithelium protects the mature enamel.

==== 6. Desmolytic stage ====
In this stage, the reduced enamel epithelium proliferates and induce atrophy. The reduced enamel epithelium releases enzymes which destroy the connective tissue, in a process known as desmolysis.

== Function ==
Ameloblasts are cells which secrete the enamel proteins enamelin and amelogenin which will later mineralize to form enamel, the hardest substance in the human body. Ameloblasts control ionic and organic compositions of enamel. It is theorized that a circadian clock (24-hour) probably regulates enamel production on a daily cycle by the ameloblasts (similar to osteoblasts in production of bone tissue). Ameloblasts adjust their secretory and resorptive activities to maintain favorable conditions for biomineralization.

== Clinical significance ==
These cells are sensitive to their environment. One common example is illustrated by the neonatal line, a pronounced incremental line of Retzius found in the primary teeth and in the larger cusps of the permanent first molars, showing a disruption in enamel production when the person is born. High fevers in childhood are also an example of bodily stressors causing interruptions in enamel production.

Another possible example of this sensitivity (stress response pathway activation) may be the development of dental fluorosis after childhood exposure (between the ages of 2 and 8 years old) to excess consumption of fluoride, an elemental agent used to increase enamel hardness and as a result, prevent dental caries.

== See also ==
- Ameloblastin
- Ameloblastoma
- Amelogenesis imperfecta
- Dentin
- Enamel
- Odontoblast
- Tooth development
- List of human cell types derived from the germ layers
- List of distinct cell types in the adult human body
