= FAM20C =

Protein-coding gene in the species Homo sapiens

Identifiers
- Aliases: FAM20C, DMP-4, DMP4, GEF-CK, RNS, family with sequence similarity 20 member C, G-CK, golgi associated secretory pathway kinase, FAM20C golgi associated secretory pathway kinase
- External IDs: OMIM: 611061; MGI: 2136853; GeneCards: FAM20C
Enzyme activity
EC #	BRENDA	ExPASy	KEGG	MetaCyc
2.7.11.1	↗	↗	↗	↗

Gene location (Human)
Chr.	Chromosome 7 (human)
Band	7p22.3	Start	192,571 bp
Band	7p22.3	End	260,772 bp

Gene location (Mouse)
Chr.	Chromosome 5 (mouse)
Band	5|5 G2	Start	138,740,269 bp
Band	5|5 G2	End	138,795,832 bp
RNA expression pattern
Bgee	Human / Mouse (ortholog); Top expressed in: right lobe of liver; body of stomach; ascending aorta; human kidney; Descending thoracic aorta; popliteal artery; tibial arteries; muscle layer of sigmoid colon; right coronary artery; left coronary artery / Top expressed in: molar; right kidney; medial geniculate nucleus; islet of Langerhans; medial dorsal nucleus; olfactory bulb; stria vascularis; proximal tubule; lateral geniculate nucleus; left lobe of liver; More reference expression data
BioGPS	n/a
Gene ontology
Molecular function	transferase activity; nucleotide binding; calcium ion binding; manganese ion binding; metal ion binding; kinase activity; protein binding; ATP binding; protein serine/threonine kinase activity; phosphotransferase activity, alcohol group as acceptor
Cellular component	Golgi apparatus; extracellular region; extracellular exosome; extracellular space; cytoplasm; endoplasmic reticulum lumen
Biological process	skeletal system development; phosphorylation; positive regulation of bone mineralization; osteoclast maturation; biomineral tissue development; regulation of fibroblast growth factor receptor signaling pathway; dentinogenesis; regulation of phosphorus metabolic process; protein phosphorylation; positive regulation of osteoblast differentiation; enamel mineralization; odontoblast differentiation; ATP metabolic process; post-translational protein modification
Sources:Amigo / QuickGO
Orthologs
Databases	NCBI: entry; OMA: entry
Species	Human	Mouse
Entrez	56975	80752
Ensembl	ENSG00000177706; ENSG00000281429; ENSG00000282147; ENSG00000288499	ENSMUSG00000025854
UniProt	Q8IXL6	Q5MJS3
RefSeq (mRNA)	NM_020223	NM_030565; NM_001359593
RefSeq (protein)	NP_064608	NP_085042; NP_001346522
Location (UCSC)	Chr 7: 0.19 – 0.26 Mb	Chr 5: 138.74 – 138.8 Mb
PubMed search
- Wikidata
View/Edit Human	View/Edit Mouse

Family with sequence similarity 20, member C also known as FAM20C or DMP4 is a protein which in humans is encoded by the FAM20C gene. Fam20C, a Golgi localized protein kinase, is a serine kinase that phosphorylates both casein and other highly acidic proteins and members of the small integrin-binding ligand, the N-linked glycoproteins (SIBLING) family at the target motif SerXGlu.

== Function ==
Dmp4 causes differentiation of mesenchymal stem cells into functional odontoblast cells and is likely to function as a regulator of dentin mineralization. FAM20C is a secretory kinase, responsible for the phosphorylation of all secreted proteins, from milk to bone proteins. Phosphorylation by Fam20C in the secretory pathway is essential for proper biomineralization of bone. The substrate specificity of FAM20C indicates, however, that it is not likely to account for the tyrosine phosphorylation of the secreted protein. The characterization of FAM20C as an active serine kinase in the Golgi apparatus provides a clear precedent that ATP dependent protein phosphorylation can take place in the secretory apparatus. Fam20C knockout mice develop severe hypophosphatemic rickets due to an increased renal phosphate wasting that is likely attributed to the remarkable elevation of serum fibroblast growth factor 23 (FGF23), while their dentin and enamel defects are largely independent from the hypophosphatemia and appear to be local effects of phosphorylation failure in the secretory calcium-binding phosphoproteins (SCPPs).

== Clinical significance ==
Mutations in the FAM20C gene are associated with Raine syndrome.
