= List of small shelly fossil taxa =

This is a list of small shelly fossils of prehistoric marine animals, ordered by their type.

== Whole-organism ==
"Small shellies" in context
| ← / Small shelly fauna; ← / Ediacaran biota; ← / Maotianshan shales; ← / Tommotian age; ← / Cambrian explosion, if sudden; ← / Ediacaran shelly fauna |
Neoproterozoic (last era of the Precambrian); Palæozoic (first era of the Phanerozoic)
Axis scale: millions of years ago.

- Namacalathus

== Monoplacophoran-like ==
- Yochelsoniella

== Scleritome elements ==
Elements of a scleritome, resembling Halkieria:

- Halkieria

Probable palaeoscolecid worm sclerites:

- Palaeoscolex
- Maikhanella

Tomotiid-like sclerites:

- Micrina
- Eccentrotheca

== Conical ==
Problematic cones:

- Cyrtochites
- Paradoxiconus

Probable Lobopodian sclerites:

- Rhombocorniculum
- Rushtonites
- Mongolitubulus

== Net-like ==
- Microdictyon
- Onychodictyon
- Quadrataporata

== Sponge spicule-like ==
- Chancelloria

== Tubular ==
- Sinotubulites
- Anabarites
- Hyolithellus
- Torellella

== See also ==
- Prehistoric marine animals
- Fossil record of animals
- Paleontology lists
