= Paracarinachites =

Paracarinachites Temporal range: 530.0–520.0 Ma

Scientific classification
- Kingdom: Animalia
- Phylum: incertae sedis
- Class: †Cambroclavida
- Family: †Zhijinitidae
- Genus: †Paracarinachites

Species
- †Paracarinachites sinensis Luo et al., 1982

Synonyms
- Luyanhaochiton Yu 1984; Yangtzechiton Yu 1984

Extinct genus of Cambrian organisms

Paracarinachites is a genus of sclerite-bearing creatures known from the early Cambrian period, originating around 530–520 Ma. They are often represented within the distinguished small shelly fauna (SSF) group because of their minuscule size – from only a few millimeters long, and because of their overt mineralized skeletons. Most SSF are from the clade Lophotrochozoa, however, it is unclear whether Paracarinachites are identified for certain as there have been rare cases of ecdysozoan SSF. Little is still known about the animal due to limited fossil collections; there are currently 27 known collections from China according to Fossilworks.

== Morphology ==
Paracarinachites are composed of an arched, biomineralized univalve shell with a multi-layered sclerite. The lower region of the shell is subdivided into two sections: a curved adapicle part and a posterior part. The adapicle part is a semicircular shape with a lower-central opening, while the posterior region has a wide, concaved curve. The sclerite that sits on top of the surface of the adapicle portion contains a simple, rugged array of 5–6 small, protruding bumps; the posterior region's sclerite carries along an alternating array of 10–14 spines.

== Ecology ==
Established as marine-dwelling detrivores, Paracarinachites spent most of their life on the surface of the ocean, attached to both fauna (plants/algae) and infauna (dead organisms) alike to feed off of. Considering they were slow-moving creatures, they were more vulnerable to larger and faster predators and had to rely on the habitual exploitation of their surrounding environment. As far as locality, Paracarinachites as well as other related Zhijinites have been found in China and in Southern France.

== Lineage ==
From what limited data has been collected, Paracarinachites may be closely related to cambroclaves according to Simon Conway Morris and colleague Chen Menge. Cambroclaves, in which Conway Morris and Menge describe as, "a major group of sclerite-bearing metazoans from the Lower Cambrian of China."
