= Paracarinachitid =

Paracarinachitid Temporal range: Cambrian

Scientific classification
- Domain: Eukaryota
- Kingdom: Animalia
- Phylum: incertae sedis
- Informal group: †Paracarinachitid

Extinct informal group of shelled animals

Paracarinachitids are a group of small shelly fossils that may be related to the cambroclaves. They resemble small limpets with a large spine on their pinnacle; they have concentric growth rings resulting from incremental growth.

== See also ==
- List of small shelly fossil taxa
