= AMELX =

Protein-coding gene in humans

Identifiers
- Aliases: AMELX, AI1E, AIH1, ALGN, AMG, AMGL, AMGX, amelogenin, X-linked, amelogenin X-linked, Amelogenin, X isoform
- External IDs: OMIM: 300391; MGI: 88005; GeneCards: AMELX

Gene location (Human)
Chr.	X chromosome (human)
Band	Xp22.2	Start	11,293,413 bp
Band	Xp22.2	End	11,300,761 bp

Gene location (Mouse)
Chr.	X chromosome (mouse)
Band	X F5|X 78.95 cM	Start	167,959,110 bp
Band	X F5|X 78.95 cM	End	167,970,196 bp
RNA expression pattern
Bgee	Human / Mouse (ortholog); Top expressed in: testicle; epithelium of colon; Achilles tendon; optic nerve; mucosa of ileum; deltoid muscle; lower lobe of lung; tibialis anterior muscle; temporal lobe; amygdala / Top expressed in: molar; embryo; mandibular molars; nucleus pulposus; sexually immature organism; temporal muscle; ascending aorta; aortic valve; olfactory epithelium; tibiofemoral joint; More reference expression data
BioGPS	n/a
Gene ontology
Molecular function	structural constituent of tooth enamel; protein binding; hydroxyapatite binding; identical protein binding; growth factor activity
Cellular component	extracellular region; cell surface; endoplasmic reticulum lumen; extracellular matrix; collagen-containing extracellular matrix; cytoplasm; Golgi apparatus; endocytic vesicle
Biological process	positive regulation of collagen biosynthetic process; chondrocyte differentiation; biomineral tissue development; multicellular organism development; odontogenesis of dentin-containing tooth; cell adhesion; tooth mineralization; osteoblast differentiation; epithelial to mesenchymal transition; enamel mineralization; signal transduction; positive regulation of tooth mineralization; regulation of cell population proliferation; post-translational protein modification; regulation of signaling receptor activity; response to nutrient; response to calcium ion
Sources:Amigo / QuickGO
Orthologs
Databases	NCBI: entry; OMA: entry
Species	Human	Mouse
Entrez	265	11704
Ensembl	ENSG00000125363	ENSMUSG00000031354
UniProt	Q99217	P63277
RefSeq (mRNA)	NM_001142; NM_182680; NM_182681	NM_001081978; NM_009666; NM_001290371
RefSeq (protein)	NP_001133; NP_872621; NP_872622	NP_001075447; NP_001277300; NP_033796
Location (UCSC)	Chr X: 11.29 – 11.3 Mb	Chr X: 167.96 – 167.97 Mb
PubMed search
- Wikidata
View/Edit Human	View/Edit Mouse

Amelogenin, X isoform is a protein that in humans is encoded by the AMELX gene. AMELX is located on the X chromosome and encodes a set of isoforms of amelogenin by alternative splicing. Amelogenin is an extracellular matrix protein involved in the process of amelogenesis, the formation of enamel on teeth.

== Function ==
AMELX is involved in biomineralization during tooth enamel development. The AMELX gene encodes for the structural modeling protein, amelogenin, which works with other amelogenesis-related proteins to direct the mineralisation of enamel. This process involves the organization of enamel rods, the basic unit of tooth enamel, as well as the inclusion and growth of hydroxyapatite crystals.

== Clinical significance ==
Mutations in AMELX result in amelogenesis imperfecta. It has been shown that mice with a knocked-out AMELX gene will present disorganized and hypoplastic enamel.

== See also ==
- AMELY
