= AMELY =

Protein-coding gene in humans

Identifiers
- Aliases: AMELY, AMGL, AMGY, amelogenin, Y-linked, amelogenin Y-linked
- External IDs: OMIM: 410000; MGI: 88005; GeneCards: AMELY

Gene location (Human)
Chr.	Y chromosome (human)
Band	Yp11.2	Start	6,865,918 bp
Band	Yp11.2	End	6,911,752 bp

Gene location (Mouse)
Chr.	X chromosome (mouse)
Band	X F5|X 78.95 cM	Start	167,959,110 bp
Band	X F5|X 78.95 cM	End	167,970,196 bp
RNA expression pattern
Bgee	Human / Mouse (ortholog); Top expressed in: testicle; gonad; sural nerve; placenta; Ventricular system of neuraxis; ventricular zone; thyroid gland; left lobe of thyroid gland; hepatobiliary system; pancreas / Top expressed in: molar; embryo; mandibular molars; nucleus pulposus; sexually immature organism; temporal muscle; ascending aorta; aortic valve; olfactory epithelium; tibiofemoral joint; More reference expression data
BioGPS	n/a
Gene ontology
Molecular function	structural constituent of tooth enamel
Cellular component	extracellular matrix; extracellular region; collagen-containing extracellular matrix
Biological process	multicellular organism development; biomineral tissue development; tooth mineralization
Sources:Amigo / QuickGO
Orthologs
Databases	NCBI: entry; OMA: entry
Species	Human	Mouse
Entrez	266	11704
Ensembl	ENSG00000099721	ENSMUSG00000031354
UniProt	Q99218	P63277
RefSeq (mRNA)	NM_001143; NM_001364814	NM_001081978; NM_009666; NM_001290371
RefSeq (protein)	NP_001134; NP_001351743	NP_001075447; NP_001277300; NP_033796
Location (UCSC)	Chr Y: 6.87 – 6.91 Mb	Chr X: 167.96 – 167.97 Mb
PubMed search
- Wikidata
View/Edit Human	View/Edit Mouse

Amelogenin, Y isoform is a protein that in humans is encoded by the AMELY gene. AMELY is located on the Y chromosome and encodes a form of amelogenin. Amelogenin is an extracellular matrix protein involved in biomineralization during tooth enamel development.

== Clinical significance ==
Mutations in the related AMELX gene on the X chromosome cause X-linked amelogenesis imperfecta.

The presence or lack of the Y isoform of Amelogenin in fossilized enamel can be used to determine the sex of ancient hominids.
