= Cambroclave =

Cambroclave Temporal range: Lower Cambrian– Middle Cambrian

Scientific classification
- Kingdom: Animalia
- Phylum: incertae sedis
- Class: †Cambroclavida; Conway Morris and Chen, 1991

Extinct class of enigmatic organisms

Cambroclaves are a group of enigmatic, phosphatized, hollow spine-shaped sclerites, known from their geographically widespread Early to Middle Cambrian fossils, which occur exclusively in shallow waters within the photic zone. They were probably originally aragonitic. They are lobate with long spines protruding centrally; these spines are in some cases (e.g. Zhijinites) pillar-like, constituted of a bundle rods (originally aragonite?) with an Ionic-like appearance. Some taxa have been compared to spicules of ecdysozoan worms, whereas others likely belong to Protomelission-like organisms, which have been argued to be affiliated with the dasycladalean green algae and the bryozoans.

== Subdivisions ==
- Family Zhijinitidae (Qian, 1978)
  - Genus Ambarchaeooides
  - Genus Cambroclavus
  - Genus Cambrothyra
  - Genus Deiradovclavus
  - Genus Deltaclavus
  - Genus Isoclavus
  - Genus Paracarinachites
  - Genus Pseudoclavus
  - Genus Sinoclavus
  - Genus Tanbaoites
  - Genus Zhijinites

== See also ==
- Paracarinachitid
