= Malcolm Snead =

American dental scientist and biomineralization researcher

Malcolm L. Snead
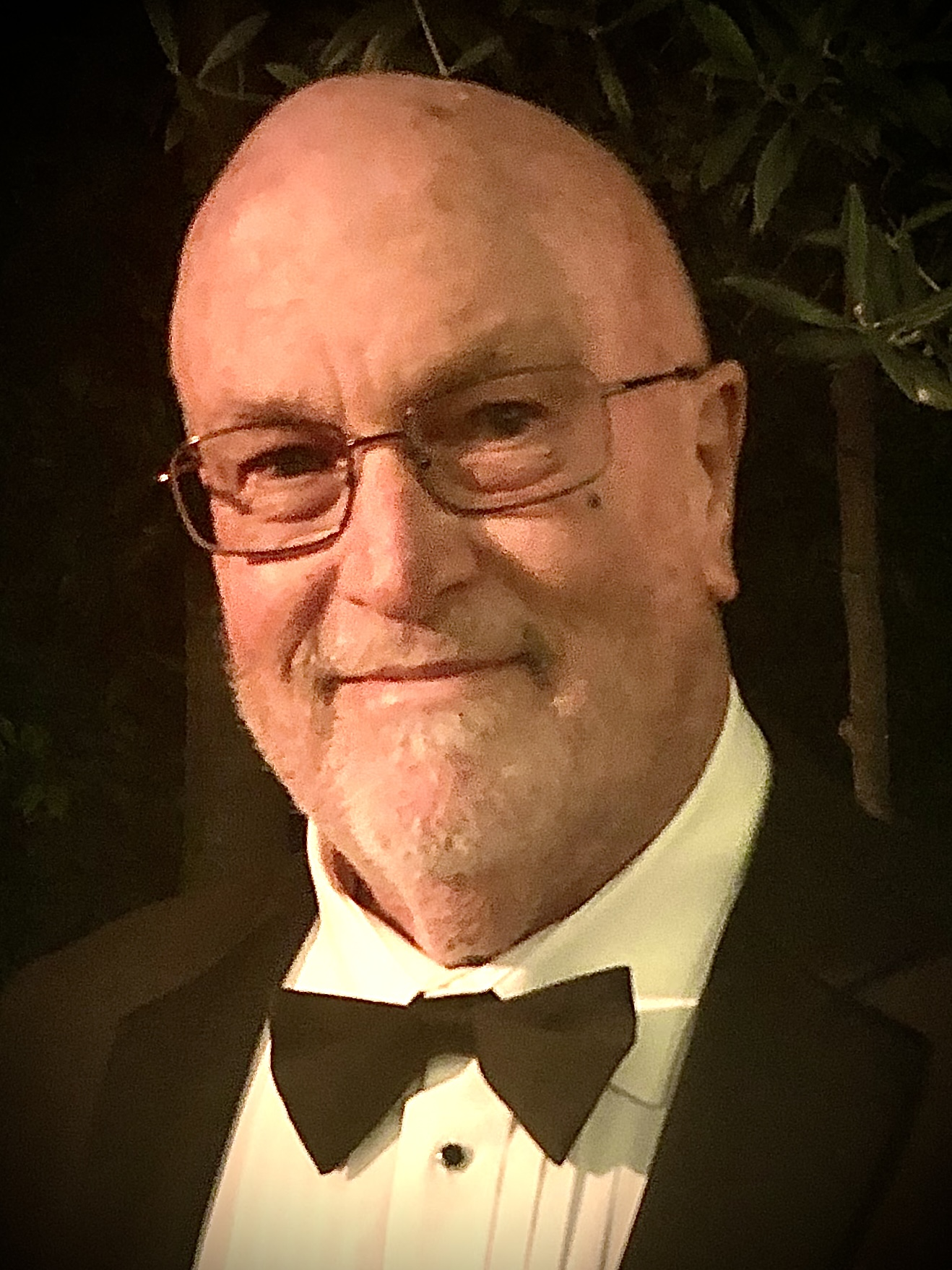
- Snead in 2020
- Education: Saint Mary's College of California (BS); Loyola University Chicago (DDS); University of Chicago (PhD)
- Known for: Research on enamel formation and amelogenin proteins
- Awards: NIH NIDCR Research Career Development Award (1985); NIH MERIT Award (2000); AAAS Fellow (1995); IADR Distinguished Scientist Award (2001); Fulbright Senior Specialist (2007); AIMBE Fellow (2018); Honorary doctorate, University of Oslo (2017)
- Scientific career
- Fields: Craniofacial molecular biology, biomineralization, oral biology
- Workplaces: University of Southern California; Herman Ostrow School of Dentistry
- Website: USC profile

Malcolm L. Snead is an American professor of biomedical sciences and researcher in craniofacial molecular biology and biomineralization. He is a professor at the Herman Ostrow School of Dentistry of the University of Southern California (USC). He is an elected Fellow of the American Association for the Advancement of Science (AAAS, 1995). He has received awards including the NIH MERIT Award and an honorary doctorate from the University of Oslo. His research focuses on enamel formation, amelogenin proteins, and biomimetic approaches to dental regeneration.

== Early life and education ==
Snead earned a Bachelor of Science degree in biology and chemistry from Saint Mary's College of California in 1973. He received his Doctor of Dental Surgery (DDS) from Loyola University Chicago in 1977, completed an oral pathology residency at the University of Chicago in 1979, and earned his PhD in pathology from the University of Chicago in 1981. He completed postdoctoral fellowships at USC (1981-1982) and Baylor College of Medicine (1982). His training in developmental biology and pathology has informed his research on disease pathways related to developmental processes in healing and regeneration.

== Career ==
Snead joined the faculty at USC's Herman Ostrow School of Dentistry in 1983 as a research associate professor, becoming a full professor in 1997. He served as associate dean for innovation and discovery from 2001 to 2006 and as chair of the Division of Biomedical Sciences from 2012 to 2022. Since 2023, he has chaired the Faculty Development Committee at the school. He is a founding member of the USC Center for Craniofacial Molecular Biology (1989-present) and an affiliate member of the Eli and Edythe Broad Center for Regenerative Medicine (part of USC Stem Cell), 2011-present. He holds affiliate faculty positions at the University of Washington (2011-present), Northwestern University (2012-present), and the University of Kansas (2016-present).

He has served as principal investigator on multiple National Institutes of Health (NIH) grants related to enamel biomineralization, nanotechnology for bone and tooth growth, and supramolecular nanofibers for bone regeneration. Snead has been continuously funded by competitive grant applications from the NIH since 1981.

== Research ==
Snead's research examines biomineralization in dental enamel, biomimetic strategies for tissue regeneration, and protein-protein interactions in enamel matrix assembly. His work includes studies on the role of amelogenin proteins in enamel formation, circadian influences on dental development, peptide-enabled interfaces for restorative dentistry, and supramolecular nanofibers for bone regeneration. According to Google Scholar, his publications have received over 14,000 citations, with an h-index of 68.

A 1997 book chapter by Simmer and Snead discusses the cloning of the amelogenin cDNA as enabling subsequent genetic and biochemical studies. A 2006 review co-authored by Snead discusses protein-protein interactions in the developing enamel matrix, including amelogenin self-assembly. A 2005 review by Paine and Snead summarizes transgenic animal models for studying enamel defects and amelogenin self-assembly domains.

Reviews cite Snead's work on amelogenin self-assembly and transgenic models in the context of enamel development. Snead presented on self-assembly directing enamel formation and regeneration at the 2015 Composites at Lake Louise conference.

His later research applies biomimetic approaches to translational applications. This includes silver diamine fluoride for caries prevention in vulnerable populations. In collaboration with Candan Tamerler, he has developed solid binding peptides for bone regeneration and antimicrobial coatings on implants.

== Selected publications ==
- Snead, Malcolm L.; Zeichner-David, Margarita; Chandra, T.; Robson, Kathryn J. H.; Woo, Savio L. C.; Slavkin, Harold C. (1983). "Construction and identification of mouse amelogenin cDNA clones". Proceedings of the National Academy of Sciences. 80 (23): 7254–7258. Bibcode:1983PNAS...80.7254S. doi:10.1073/pnas.80.23.7254. PMC 390037. PMID 6584975.
- Snead, Malcolm L.; Lau, E. C.; Zeichner-David, M.; Fincham, A. G.; Woo, S. L. C. (1985). "DNA sequence for cloned cDNA for murine amelogenin reveal the amino acid sequence for enamel-specific protein". Biochemical and Biophysical Research Communications. 129 (3): 812–818. doi:10.1016/0006-291x(85)91964-3. PMID 4015654.
- Lau, E. C.; Mohandas, T. K.; Shapiro, L. J.; Slavkin, H. C.; Snead, M. L. (February 1989). "Human and mouse amelogenin gene loci are on the sex chromosomes". Genomics. 4 (2): 162–168. doi:10.1016/0888-7543(89)90296-6. PMID 2563706.
- Jabs, E. W.; Müller, U.; Li, X.; Ma, L.; Luo, W.; Haworth, I. S.; Klisak, I.; Sparkes, R.; Mohandas, T. K.; Warman, M. L.; Mulliken, J. B.; Snead, M. L.; Maxson, R. (5 November 1993). "A mutation in the homeodomain of the human MSX2 gene in a family affected with autosomal dominant craniosynostosis". Cell. 75 (3): 443–450. doi:10.1016/0092-8674(93)90379-5. PMID 8221886.
- Bartlett, John D.; Ganss, Bernhard; Goldberg, Michel; Moradian-Oldak, Janet; Paine, Michael L.; Snead, Malcolm L.; Wen, Xin; White, Shane N.; Zhou, Yan L. (2006). "Protein-protein interactions of the developing enamel matrix". Current Topics in Developmental Biology. 74: 57–115. doi:10.1016/S0070-2153(06)74003-0. ISBN 978-0-12-153174-4. PMID 16860665.
- Simmer, James P.; Hu, Jan C.-C.; Lertlam, Rangsiyakorn; Yamakoshi, Yasuo; Koo, Hyun (July 2017). "Dental Enamel Formation and Implications for Oral Health and Disease". Physiological Reviews. 97 (3): 939–993. Bibcode:2017PhyRv..97..939L. doi:10.1152/physrev.00030.2016. PMC 6151498. PMID 28468833.
- Geng, Shuhui; Lei, Yaping; Snead, Malcolm L. (June 2021). "Minimal amelogenin domain for enamel formation". JOM. 73 (6): 1696–1704. Bibcode:2021JOM....73.1696G. doi:10.1007/s11837-021-04687-x. PMC 8386916. PMID 34456537.
- Woolfolk, Sarah K.; Arnold, Amold; Snead, Malcolm L.; Black, Edward; Chen, Casey; Tamerler, Candan (2022). "Peptide-Enabled Nanocomposites Offer Biomimetic Reconstruction of Silver Diamine Fluoride-Treated Dental Tissues". Polymers. 14 (7): 1368. doi:10.3390/polym14071368. PMC 9002525. PMID 35406242.
- Boone, Kyle; Wisdom, Cate; Camarda, Stefano; Spencer, Paulette; Tamerler, Candan; Snead, Malcolm L.; Misra, Anil (2024). "Machine learning-enabled design features of antimicrobial peptides selectively targeting peri-implant disease progression". Frontiers in Dental Medicine. 5 1372534. doi:10.3389/fdmed.2024.1372534. PMC 11155447. PMID 38846578.

== Awards and honors ==
- Johnson and Johnson Fellow (1976-1977).
- Walter G. Zoller Fellow, The University of Chicago (1977-1981).
- National Institute of Dental Research (NIDR) Research Career Development Award, United States Public Health Service, NIH (1985-1990).
- Dana-Farber Computer Resource Center Fellowship (1988).
- Elected Fellow of the American Association for the Advancement of Science (AAAS) in 1995.
- NIH Method to Extend Research in Time (MERIT) Award (R37), National Institute of Dental and Craniofacial Research (NIDCR) (2000).
- International Association for Dental Research (IADR) Distinguished Scientist Award in Research in Oral Biology (2001).
- Fulbright Senior Specialist Award (2007).
- Mellon Faculty Mentoring Award, University of Southern California (2010).
- Honorary doctorate (doctor honoris causa) from the University of Oslo in 2017.
- Elected Fellow of the American Institute for Medical and Biological Engineering (AIMBE) in 2018.
