= Susannah M. Porter =

American paleontologist

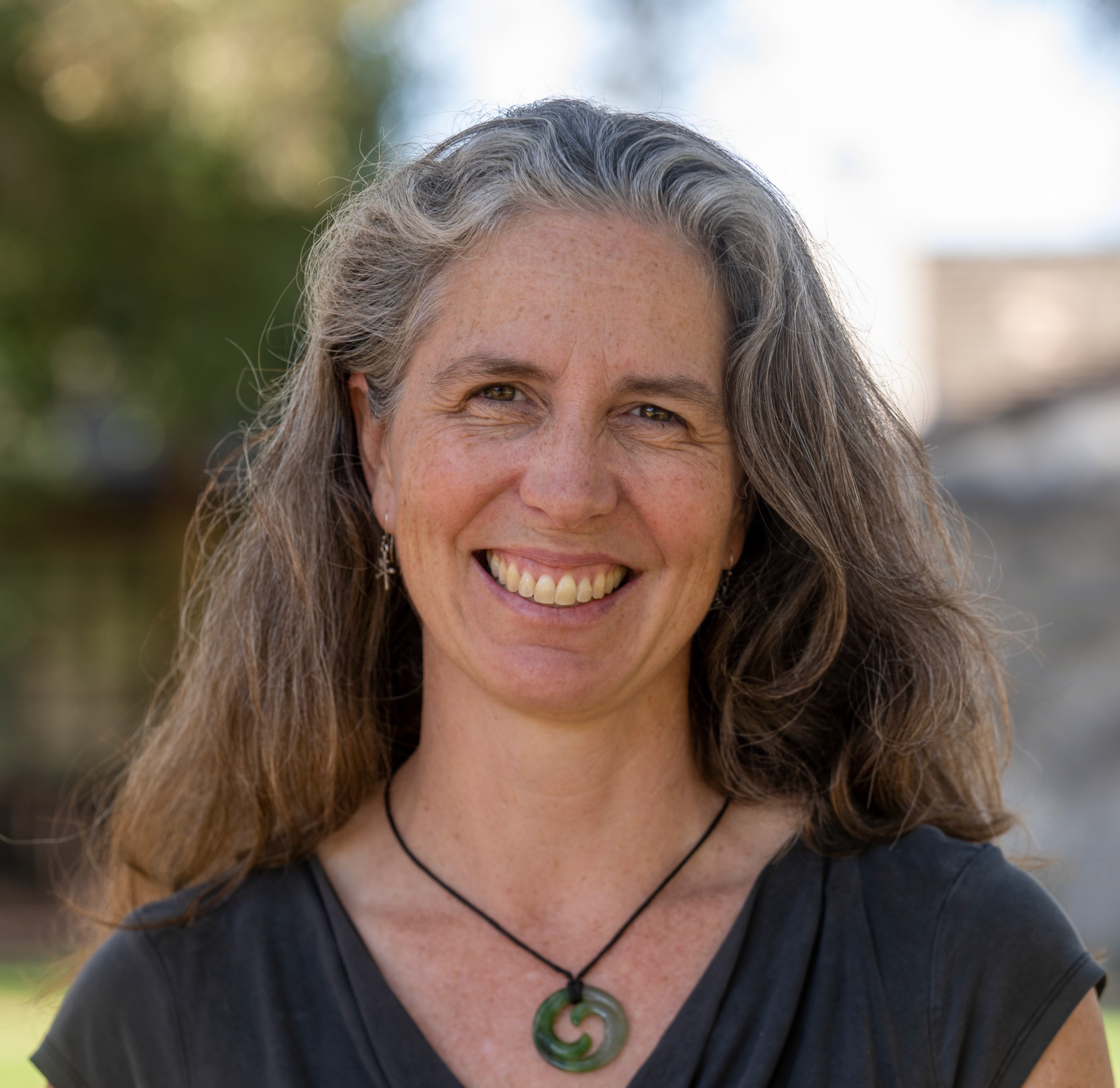
- Education: Yale, Harvard
- Known for: Studies of early life
- Awards: Fellow of the Paleontological Society
- Scientific career
- Fields: Paleontology
- Workplaces: UCLA, UC Santa Barbara
- Doctoral advisor: Andrew Knoll

Susannah M. Porter is an American paleontologist and geobiologist who studies the early evolution of eukaryotes, the early Cambrian fossil record of animals, and the evolution of skeletal biomineralization. She is currently a professor at the University of California, Santa Barbara. Porter is a Fellow of the Paleontological Society. She has received national recognition awards from the Geological Society of America.

== Education and early life ==
Susannah Porter was born in Seattle, Washington, in 1973. She attended Shorewood High School. She graduated from Yale University in 1995 with a degree in mathematics, and was recognized with the Anthony D. Stanley Prize for excellence in pure and applied mathematics. She was also awarded the Francis Gordon Brown '01 Memorial Prize. While there she was a member of the Yale Woman's Crew team, was part of the Varsity 8 that placed 2nd in the 1994 National Championship, and was named to US Rowing's Academic All American team. Porter next joined the Department of Organismic and Evolutionary Biology at Harvard University where she studied with Andrew H. Knoll. Her dissertation was entitled "Windows on Early Eukaryotic and Early Animal Evolution". From there she joined UCLA in 2002 where she was a National Research Council Post-Doctoral Fellow at the NASA Astrobiology Institute. She joined the UCSB faculty in 2003 where she is now a professor and department chair.

== Research and impact ==
Porter's research examines the early evolution of eukaryotes during the Proterozoic and Cambrian, 2.5 billion to circa. 500 million years ago. Her work has included the description of both early protistan microfossils and Cambrian animals, in particular the small shelly fossils, as well as studies of their preservation, and their utility in telling geologic time or biostratigraphy.

=== Early predators ===
Porter's work on vase-shaped microfossils from the late Tonian Chuar Group of the Grand Canyon, Arizona, showed that these globally widespread protistan fossils are shells of testate amoebae, in particular, members of the Arcellinida, in the Amoebozoa clade. Porter and her student Leigh Anne Riedman also described diverse organic-walled microfossils from Chuar Group shales and mudstones some of which included evidence of predation. She has argued that protistan predation may have been an important driver of early eukaryote diversification.

=== The evolution of mineralized skeletons ===
Porter's work with Michael Vendrasco and colleagues showed that early molluscs rapidly evolved a diversity of shell microstructures, including complex shells made of layers exhibiting different microstructures. That work as well as work with John Moore on other shelly Cambrian animals suggest that these microstructures were adapted for defense against shell crushing predators.

Professor Porter's work on the evolution of carbonate biomineralization showed that seawater chemistry at the time a skeleton first evolved in a lineage influenced what carbonate mineral made up skeletons. First appearances of aragonite skeletons were clustered in time in the earliest Cambrian and in the Triassic through early Jurassic and first appearances of calcitic skeletons were clustered in the later early Cambrian through Devonian. These clusters match broad oscillations in seawater between aragonite-favoring conditions and calcite-favoring conditions.

=== Origin of eukaryotic cells ===
Porter and colleagues are part of a wide collaboration sponsored by the Gordon and Betty Moore Foundation and the Simons Foundation that is focused on understanding how eukaryote cells first evolved. Their goal is to reconstruct the redox habitats of early (>1 billion-year-old) fossil eukaryotes to determine when aerobic metabolism evolved and, possibly, when mitochondria were acquired.

== Awards and honors ==
In 2019 Porter was elected Fellow of the Paleontological Society. In 2017 she received the Geological Society of America Geobiology and Geomicrobiology Division Post-Tenure Award. Prior to that in 2013 she received the W. Storrs Cole Memorial Research Award, Geological Society of America.

== Professional activities ==
Porter continues to be a keynote speaker at national and international scientific conferences. These include the Pardee Symposium of the Geological Society of America in 2019, the International Biomineralization Symposium in 2019, Distinguished Lecturer at the University of New Mexico in 2018, and other keynotes in Brazil and the U.K. In 2013 she gave a TEDx presentation, Strange Worlds.

Since 2021 Porter is chair of the Paleontological Society Fellows Committee. During 2012–20 she was secretary of the Subcommission on Cryogenian Stratigraphy. Since 2008 Porter has been a member of the Editorial Advisory Board of Geobiology. In 2019 she was a Panel Member for the Swedish Research Council. During 2008–11 she was a member of the Geological Society of America's Committee on Research Grants.

== Selected works ==
- Woltz, C. R.; Porter, S. M.; Agić, H.; Dehler, C. M.; Junium, C. K.; Riedman, L. A.; Hodgskiss, M. S. W.; Wörndle, S.; Halverson, G. P. (2021). "Total organic carbon and the preservation of organic-walled microfossils in Precambrian shale". Geology. 49 (5): 556–560. doi:10.1130/G48116.1.
- Riedman, Leigh Anne; Porter, Susannah M.; Czaja, Andrew D. (2021). "Phosphatic scales in vase-shaped microfossil assemblages from Death Valley, Grand Canyon, Tasmania, and Svalbard". Geobiology. 19 (4): 364–375. doi:10.1111/gbi.12439. ISSN 1472-4669. PMID 33634584. S2CID 232056841.
- Gilbert, Pupa U. P. A.; Porter, Susannah M.; Sun, Chang-Yu; Xiao, Shuhai; Gibson, Brandt M.; Shenkar, Noa; Knoll, Andrew H. (2019-09-03). "Biomineralization by particle attachment in early animals". Proceedings of the National Academy of Sciences. 116 (36): 17659–17665. doi:10.1073/pnas.1902273116. ISSN 0027-8424. PMC 6731633. PMID 31427519.
- Riedman, Leigh Anne; Porter, Susannah M.; Calver, Clive R. (2018-12-01). "Vase-shaped microfossil biostratigraphy with new data from Tasmania, Svalbard, Greenland, Sweden and the Yukon". Precambrian Research. Descent into the Cryogenian. 319: 19–36. doi:10.1016/j.precamres.2017.09.019. ISSN 0301-9268. S2CID 133746303.
- Riedman, Leigh Anne; Porter, Susannah (2016). "Organic-walled microfossils of the mid-Neoproterozoic Alinya Formation, Officer Basin, Australia". Journal of Paleontology. 90 (5): 854–887. doi:10.1017/jpa.2016.49. ISSN 0022-3360. S2CID 132652277.
- Shields-Zhou, Graham A.; Porter, Susannah; Halverson, Galen P. (2016-03-01). "A new rock-based definition for the Cryogenian Period (circa 720 – 635 Ma)". Episodes. 39 (1): 3–8. doi:10.18814/epiiugs/2016/v39i1/89231. ISSN 0705-3797.
- Dehler, Carol M.; Porter, Susannah M.; Timmons, J. Michael (2012), "The Neoproterozoic Earth system revealed from the Chuar Group of Grand Canyon", Grand Canyon Geology: Two Billion Years of Earth's History, Geological Society of America, doi:10.1130/2012.2489(03), ISBN 978-0-8137-2489-8
- Maloof, Adam C.; Porter, Susannah M.; Moore, John L.; Dudás, Frank Ö; Bowring, Samuel A.; Higgins, John A.; Fike, David A.; Eddy, Michael P. (2010). "The earliest Cambrian record of animals and ocean geochemical change". GSA Bulletin. 122 (11–12): 1731–1774. doi:10.1130/B30346.1. ISSN 0016-7606.
- Porter, S.M. 2004. Closing the 'phosphatization window': implications for interpreting the record of small shelly fossils. Palaios 19: 178–183.
- Porter, Susannah M. (2004). "Halkieriids in Middle Cambrian Phosphatic Limestones from Australia". Journal of Paleontology. 78 (3): 574–590. doi:10.1666/0022-3360(2004)078<0574:HIMCPL>2.0.CO;2. ISSN 0022-3360. S2CID 131557288.

== See also ==
- Acritarch
- Asgard archaea
- Ediacaran
- Great Oxidation Event
- Hyolitha
- Mitochondrial DNA
