= Cyrtochites =

Cyrtochites Temporal range: Early Cambrian

Scientific classification
- Kingdom: Animalia
- Phylum: incertae sedis
- Genus: †Cyrtochites; Qian & Bengtson, 1989

Extinct genus of shelled animals

Cyrtochites is a genus of taxonomically-problematic tooth-shaped small shelly fossil reconstructed as the jaw of a predatory organism.
