= Paradoxiconus =

Paradoxiconus Temporal range: Cambrian Stage 2

Scientific classification
- Kingdom: Animalia
- Phylum: incertae sedis
- Genus: †Paradoxiconus; Qian et al., 2001

Type species
- Paradoxiconus typicalis

Extinct genus of problematic fossils

Paradoxiconus is a taxon of problematic spine with a smooth tip and a striated and ornamented base, known from phosphatic fossils from the middle Meishucunian.
