= Biomineralization =

Process by which living organisms produce minerals

IUPAC definition

Biomineralization: Complete conversion of organic substances to inorganic derivatives by living organisms, especially micro-organisms.

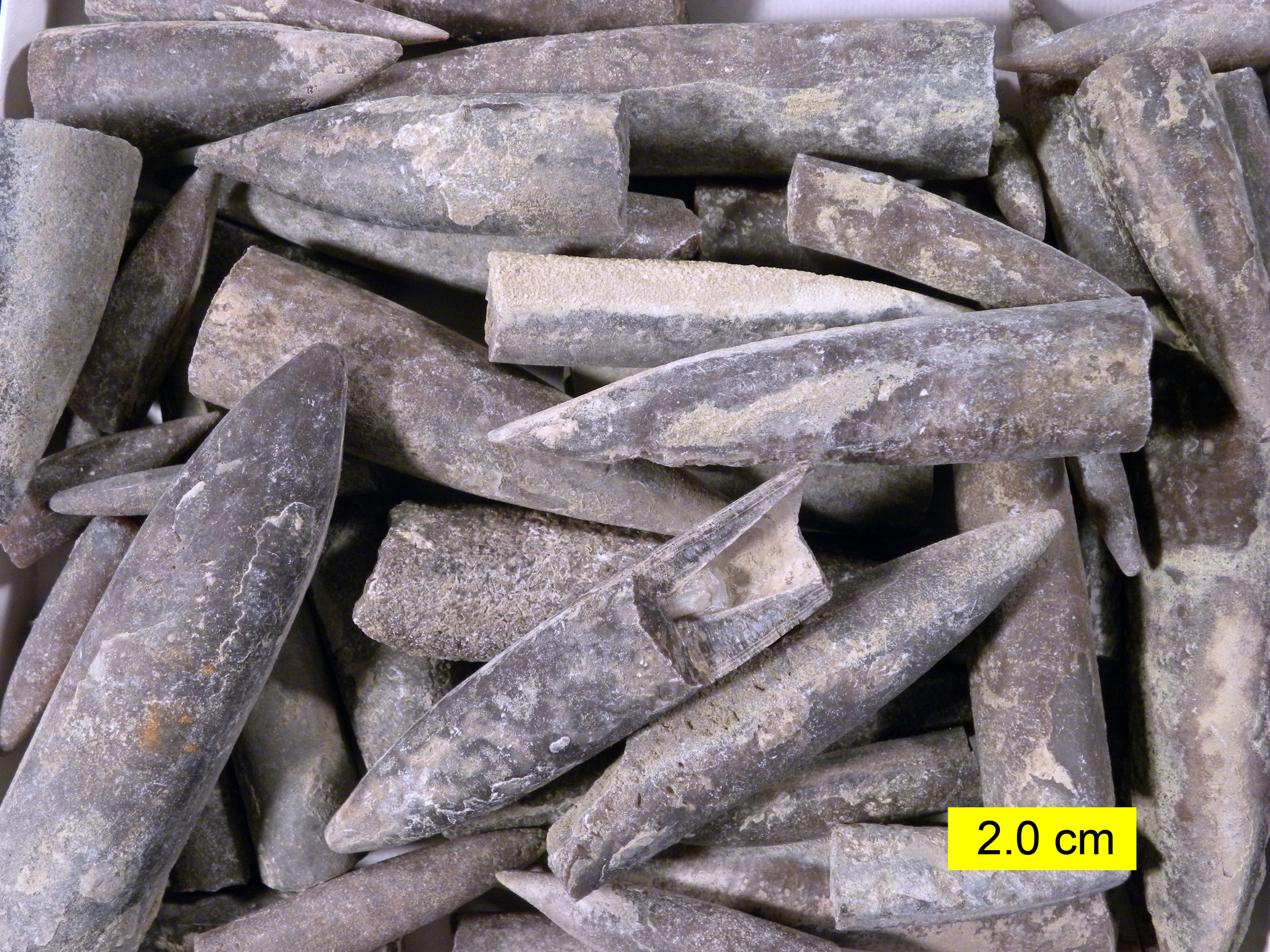
Fossil skeletal parts from extinct belemnite cephalopods of the Jurassic – these contain mineralized calcite and aragonite.

Biomineralization, also written biomineralisation, is the process by which living organisms produce or retain inorganic minerals, (Note: The International Union of Pure and Applied Chemistry defines biomineralization as "mineralization caused by cell-mediated phenomena" and notes that it "is a process generally concomitant to biodegradation".) often resulting in hardened or stiffened mineralized tissues. It is an extremely widespread phenomenon: all major lineages of the Earth's biosphere contain members that can form minerals, and over 60 different minerals have been identified in organisms. Examples include silicates in algae, diatoms and sponges, carbonates in invertebrates, and calcium phosphates and carbonates in vertebrates. These minerals often form structural features such as sea shells and the bone in mammals and birds.

Organisms have been producing mineralized skeletons for the past 550 million years. Calcium carbonates and calcium phosphates are usually crystalline, but silica organisms (such as sponges and diatoms) are always non-crystalline minerals. Other examples include copper, iron, and gold deposits involving bacteria. Biologically formed minerals often have special uses such as magnetic sensors in magnetotactic bacteria (Fe_{3}O_{4}), gravity-sensing devices (CaCO_{3}, CaSO_{4}, BaSO_{4}) and iron storage and mobilization (Fe_{2}O_{3}•H_{2}O in the protein ferritin).

In terms of taxonomic distribution, the most common biominerals are the phosphate and carbonate salts of calcium that are used in conjunction with organic polymers such as collagen and chitin to give structural support to bones and shells. The structures of these biocomposite materials are highly controlled from the nanometer to the macroscopic level, resulting in complex architectures that provide multifunctional properties. Because this range of control over mineral growth is desirable for materials engineering applications, there is interest in understanding and elucidating the mechanisms of biologically controlled biomineralization.

== Types ==
Mineralization can be subdivided into different categories depending on the following: the organisms or processes that create chemical conditions necessary for mineral formation, the origin of the substrate at the site of mineral precipitation, and the degree of control that the substrate has on crystal morphology, composition, and growth. These subcategories include biomineralization, organomineralization, and inorganic mineralization, which can be subdivided further. However, the usage of these terms varies widely in the scientific literature because there are no standardized definitions. The following definitions are based largely on a paper written by Dupraz et al. (2009), which provided a framework for differentiating these terms.

=== Biomineralization ===
Biomineralization, biologically controlled mineralization, occurs when crystal morphology, growth, composition, and location are completely controlled by the cellular processes of a specific organism. Examples include the shells of invertebrates, such as molluscs and brachiopods. Additionally, the mineralization of collagen provides crucial compressive strength for the bones, cartilage, and teeth of vertebrates.

=== Organomineralization ===
This type of mineralization includes both biologically induced mineralization and biologically influenced mineralization.

- Biologically induced mineralization occurs when the metabolic activity of microbes (e.g. bacteria) produces chemical conditions favorable for mineral formation. The substrate for mineral growth is the organic matrix, secreted by the microbial community, and affects crystal morphology and composition. Examples of this type of mineralization include calcareous or siliceous stromatolites and other microbial mats. A more specific type of biologically induced mineralization, remote calcification or remote mineralization, takes place when calcifying microbes occupy a shell-secreting organism and alter the chemical environment surrounding the area of shell formation. The result is mineral formation not strongly controlled by the cellular processes of the animal host (i.e., remote mineralization); this may lead to unusual crystal morphologies.
- Biologically influenced mineralization takes place when chemical conditions surrounding the site of mineral formation are influenced by abiotic processes (e.g., evaporation or degassing). However, the organic matrix (secreted by microorganisms) is responsible for crystal morphology and composition. Examples include micro- to nanometer-scale crystals of various morphologies.

Biological mineralization can also take place as a result of fossilization. See also Calcification.

== Biological roles ==
Among animals, biominerals composed of calcium carbonate, calcium phosphate, or silica perform a variety of roles such as support, defense, and feeding.

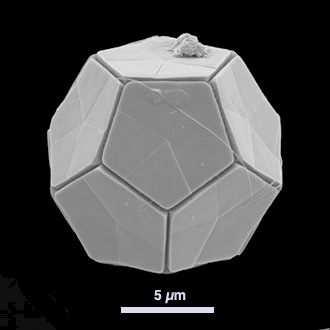
Many protists, like this coccolithophore, have protective mineralised shells.

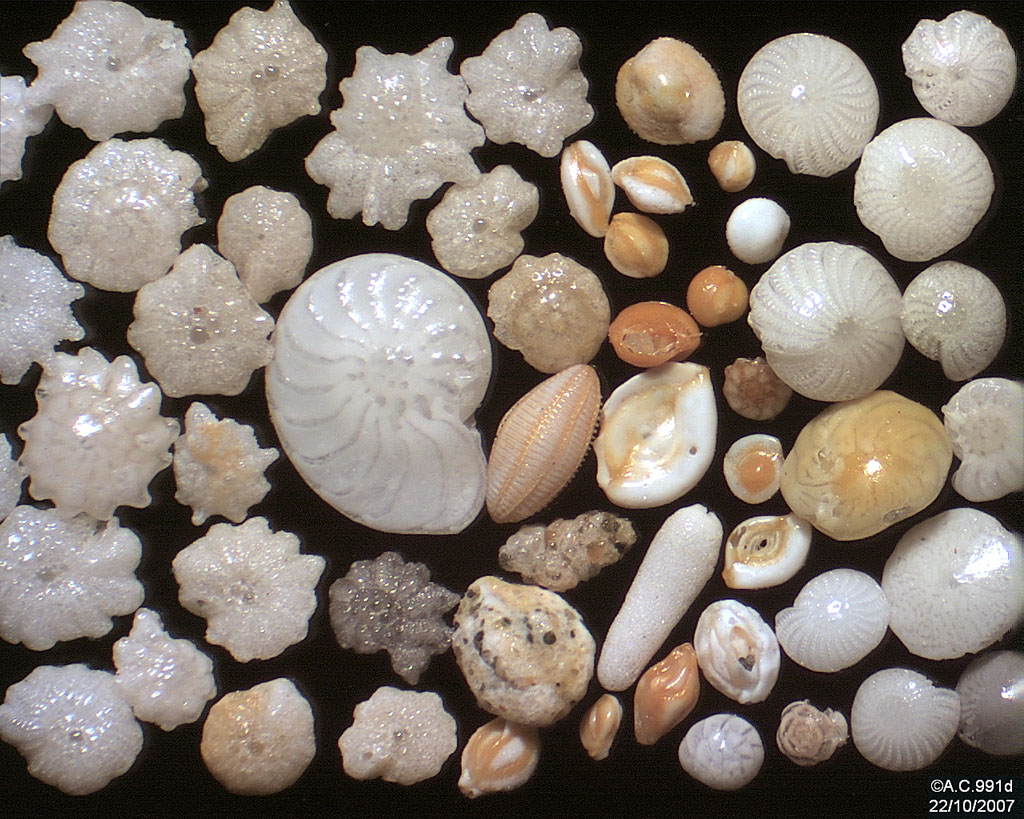
Forams from a beach

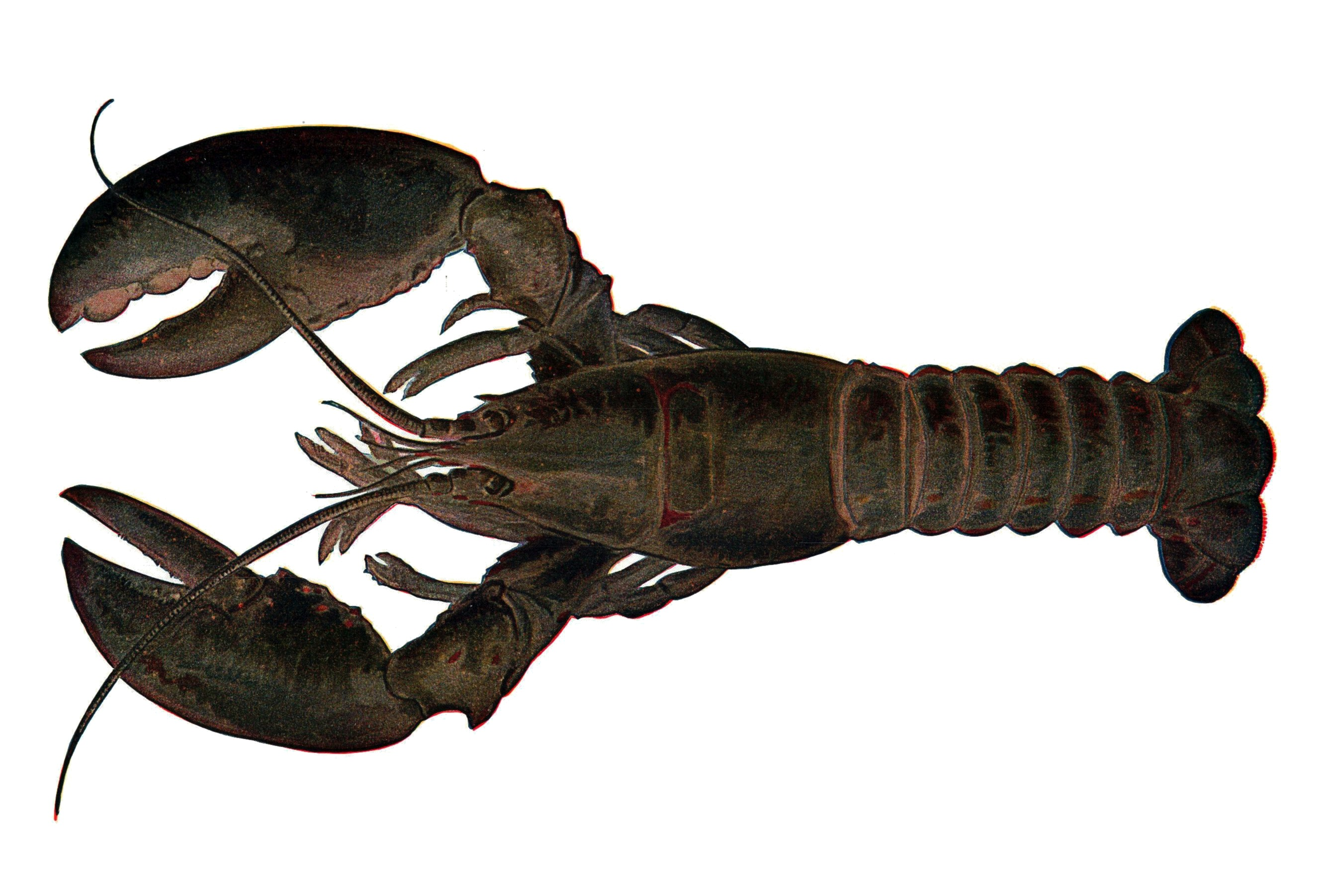
Many invertebrate animals have external exoskeletons or shells, which achieve rigidity by a variety of mineralisations.

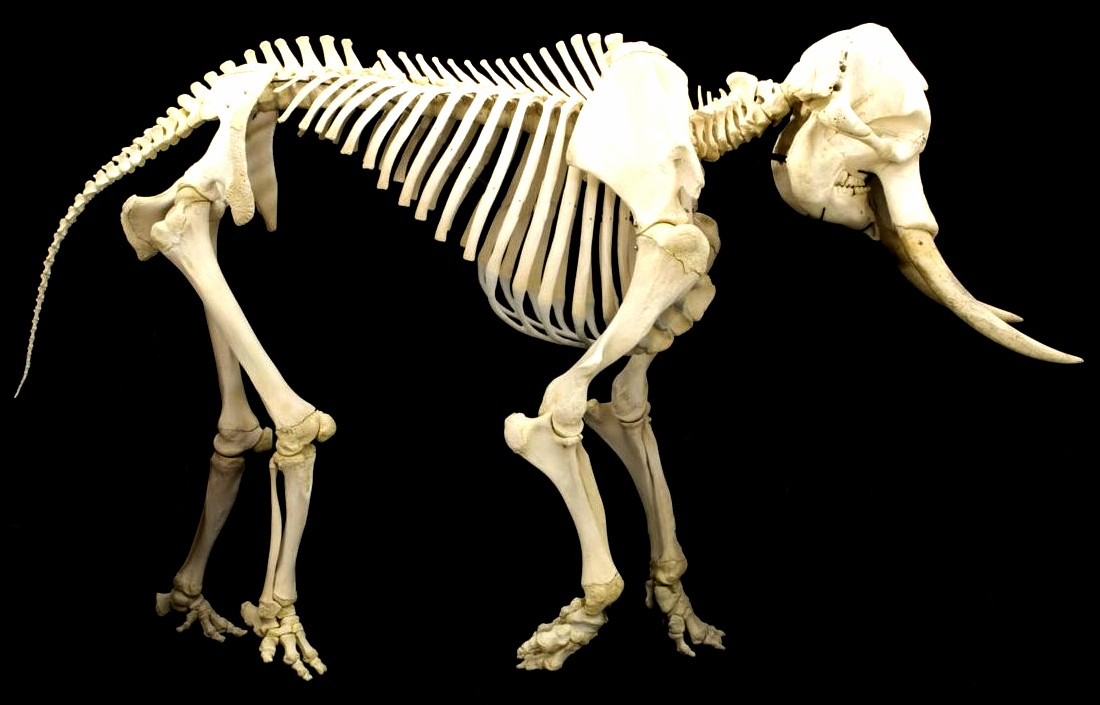
Vertebrate animals have internal endoskeletons which achieve rigidity by binding calcium phosphate into hydroxylapatite.

If present on a supracellular scale, biominerals are usually deposited by a dedicated organ, which is often defined very early in embryological development. This organ will contain an organic matrix that facilitates and directs the deposition of crystals. The matrix may be collagen, as in deuterostomes, or based on chitin or other polysaccharides, as in molluscs.

=== In molluscs ===
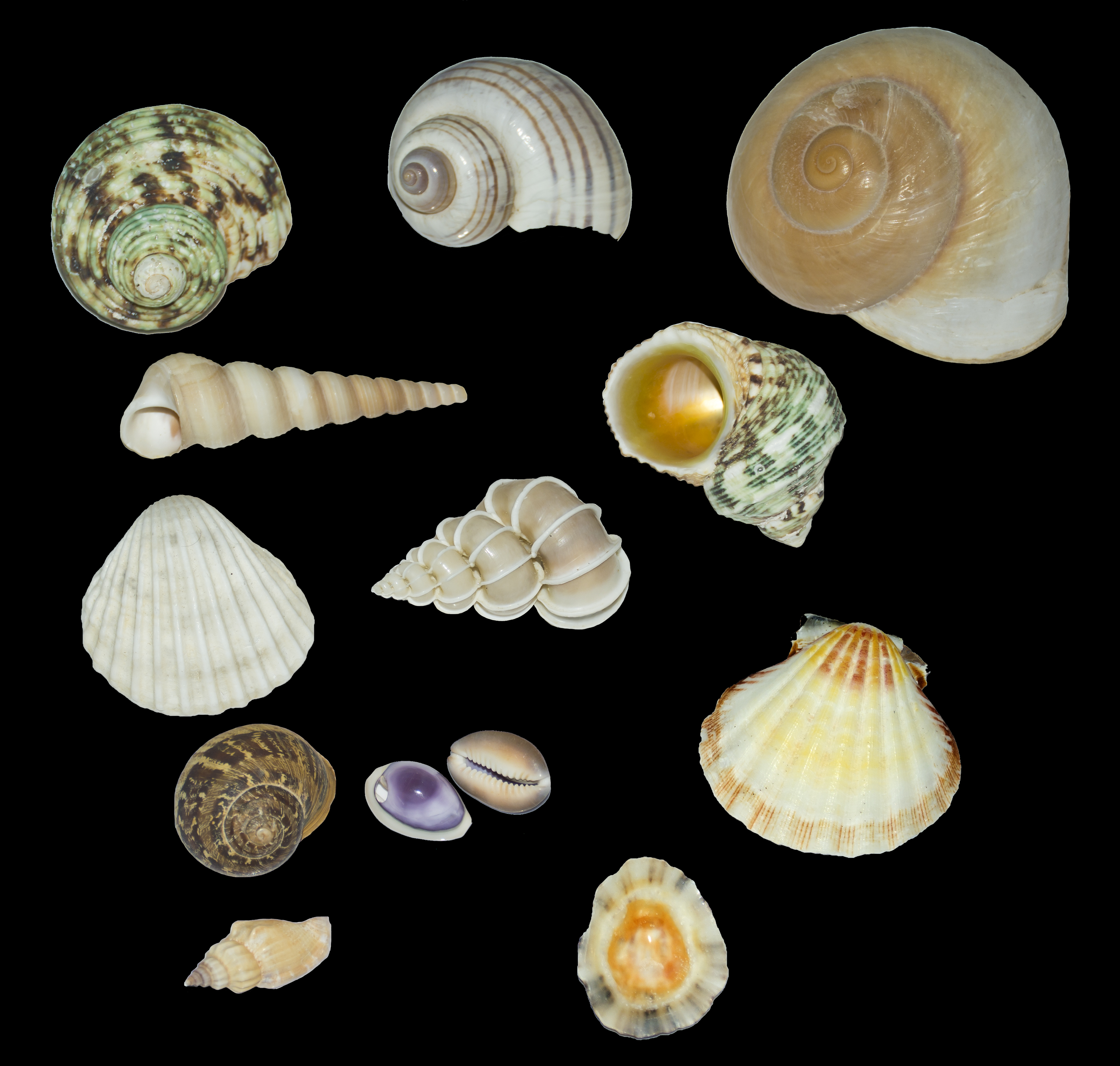
A variety of mollusc shells

The mollusc shell is a biogenic composite material that has been the subject of much interest in materials science because of its unusual properties and its model character for biomineralization. Molluscan shells consist of 95–99% calcium carbonate by weight, while an organic component makes up the remaining 1–5%. The resulting composite has a fracture toughness ≈3000 times greater than that of the crystals themselves. In the biomineralization of the mollusc shell, specialized proteins are responsible for directing crystal nucleation, phase, morphology, and growths dynamics and ultimately give the shell its remarkable mechanical strength. The application of biomimetic principles elucidated from mollusc shell assembly and structure may help in fabricating new composite materials with enhanced optical, electronic, or structural properties.

The most described arrangement in mollusc shells is the nacre, known in large shells such as Pinna or the pearl oyster (Pinctada). Not only does the structure of the layers differ, but so do their mineralogy and chemical composition. Both contain organic components (proteins, sugars, and lipids), and the organic components are characteristic of the layer and of the species. The structures and arrangements of mollusc shells are diverse, but they share some features: the main part of the shell is crystalline calcium carbonate (aragonite, calcite), though some amorphous calcium carbonate occurs as well; and although they react as crystals, they never show angles and facets.

=== In fungi ===
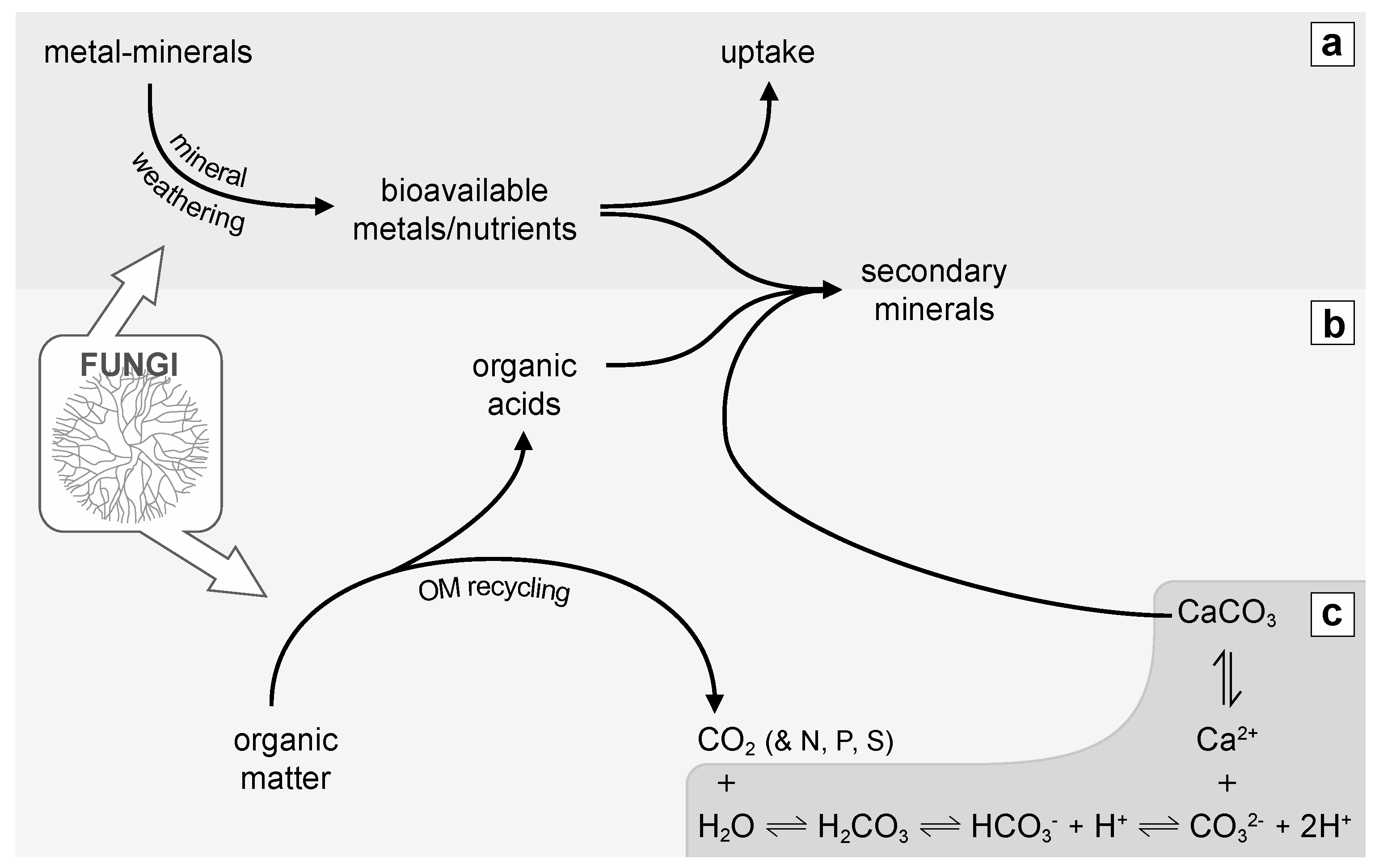
Global involvement of fungi in some biogeochemical cycles (a) Fungi contribute substantially to mineral weathering, leading to the release of bioavailable metals or nutrients, which eventually may be uptaken by living organisms or precipitated as secondary minerals (b) Fungi as heterotrophs, recycle organic matter. While doing so, they produce metabolites such as organic acids that can also precipitate as secondary minerals (salts). Recycling organic matter eventually releases constitutive elements such as C, N, P, and S (c) CO_{2} produced by heterotrophic fungal respiration can dissolve into H_{2}O and depending on the physicochemical conditions precipitate as CaCO_{3} leading to the formation of a secondary mineral.

Fungi are a diverse group of organisms that belong to the eukaryotic domain. Studies of their significant roles in geological processes, "geomycology", have shown that fungi are involved with biomineralization, biodegradation, and metal-fungal interactions.

In studying fungi's roles in biomineralization, it has been found that fungi deposit minerals with the help of an organic matrix, such as a protein, that provides a nucleation site for the growth of biominerals. Fungal growth may produce a copper-containing mineral precipitate, such as copper carbonate produced from a mixture of (NH_{4})_{2}CO_{3} and CuCl_{2}. The production of the copper carbonate is produced in the presence of proteins made and secreted by the fungi. These fungal proteins that are found extracellularly aid in the size and morphology of the carbonate minerals precipitated by the fungi.

In addition to precipitating carbonate minerals, fungi can also precipitate uranium-containing phosphate biominerals in the presence of organic phosphorus that acts as a substrate for the process. The fungi produce a hyphal matrix, also known as mycelium, that localizes and accumulates the uranium minerals that have been precipitated. Although uranium is often deemed toxic to living organisms, certain fungi such as Aspergillus niger and Paecilomyces javanicus can tolerate it.

Though minerals can be produced by fungi, they can also be degraded, mainly by oxalic acid–producing strains of fungi. Oxalic acid production is increased in the presence of glucose for three organic acid producing fungi: Aspergillus niger, Serpula himantioides, and Trametes versicolor. These fungi have been found to corrode apatite and galena minerals. Degradation of minerals by fungi is carried out through a process known as neogenesis. The order of most to least oxalic acid secreted by the fungi studied are Aspergillus niger, followed by Serpula himantioides, and finally Trametes versicolor.

=== In bacteria ===
It is less clear what purpose biominerals serve in bacteria. One hypothesis is that cells create them to avoid entombment by their own metabolic byproducts. Iron oxide particles may also enhance their metabolism.

== Other roles ==
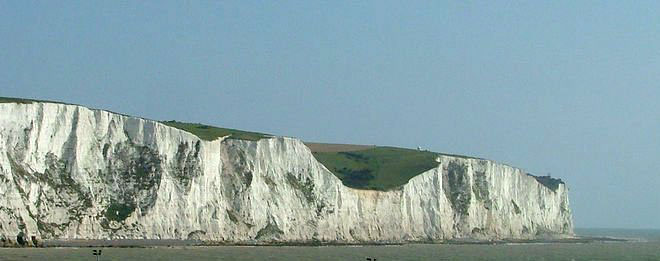
The chalk of the White Cliffs of Dover is almost entirely formed from fossil skeleton remains (coccoliths), biomineralized by planktonic microorganisms (coccolithophores).

Biomineralization plays significant global roles terraforming the planet, as well as in biogeochemical cycles and as a carbon sink.

== Composition ==
Most biominerals can be grouped by chemical composition into one of three distinct mineral classes: silicates, carbonates, or phosphates.

=== Silicates ===
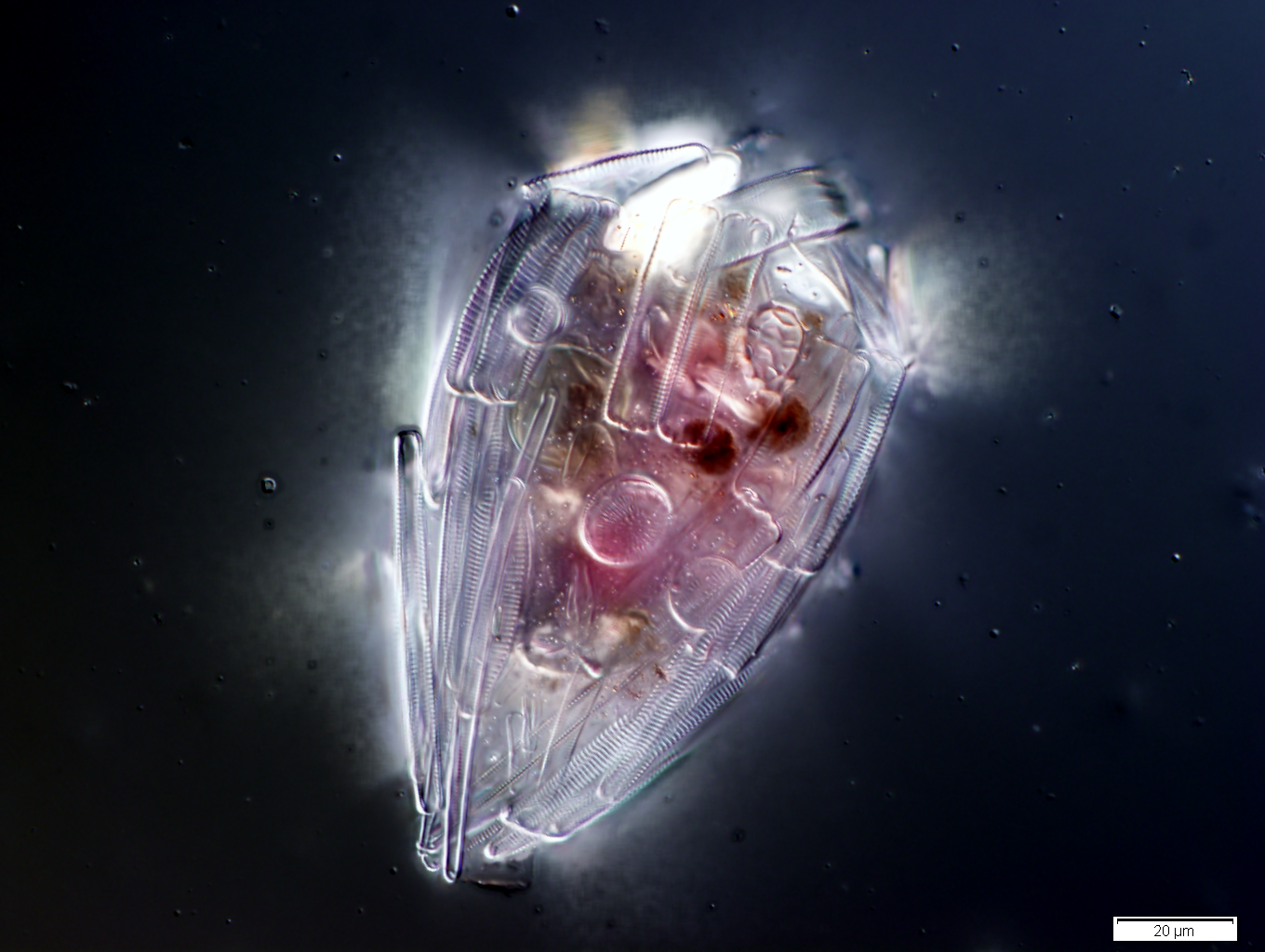
A testate amoeba which has covered itself with protective diatom frustules

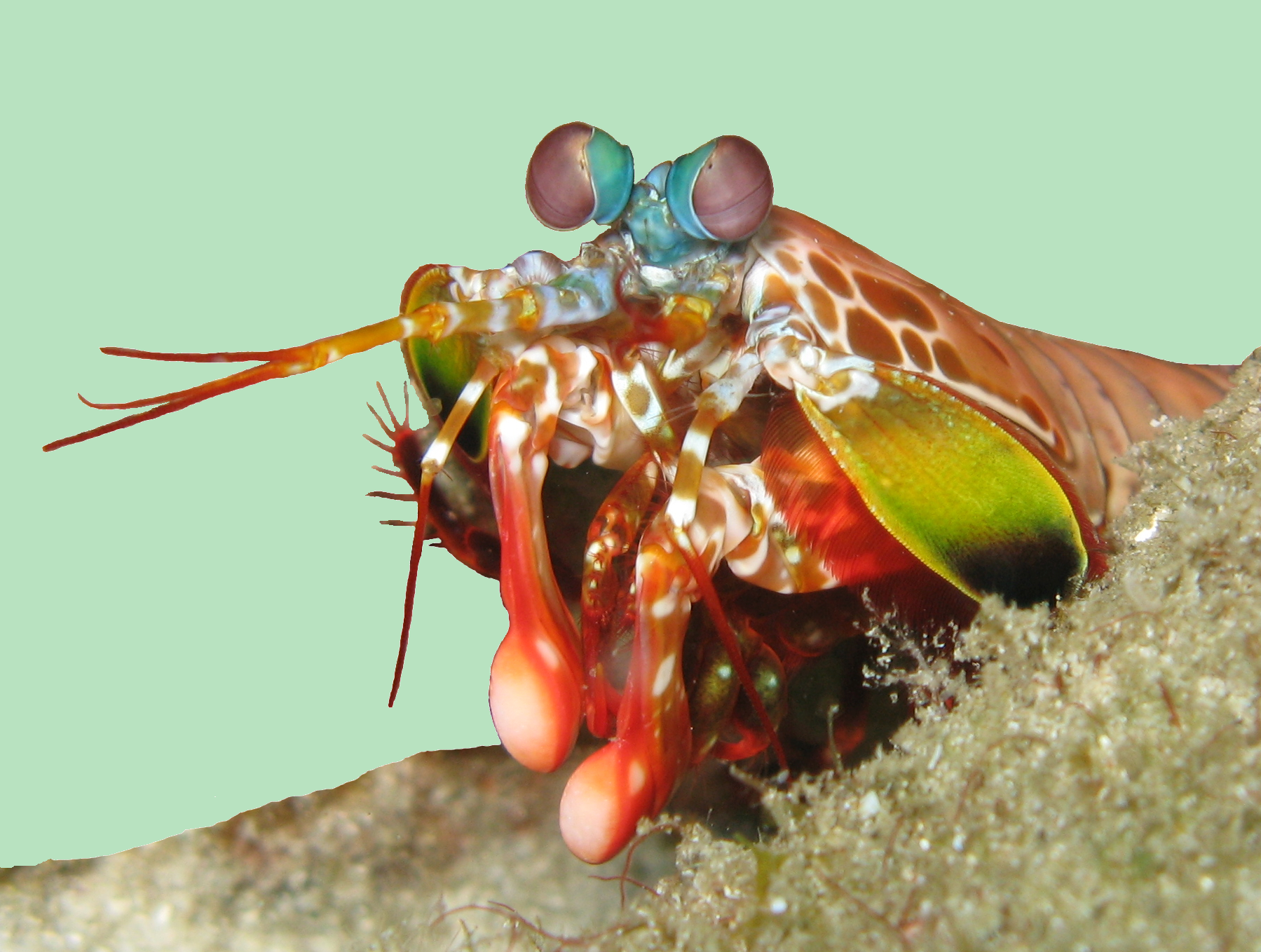
Peacock mantis shrimp smash their prey by swinging club-like raptorial claws made of hydroxyapatite.

Silicates (glass) are common in marine biominerals, where diatoms form frustules and radiolaria form capsules from hydrated amorphous silica (opal).

=== Carbonates ===
The major carbonate in biominerals is CaCO_{3}. The most common polymorphs in biomineralization are calcite (e.g. foraminifera, coccolithophores) and aragonite (e.g. corals), although metastable vaterite and amorphous calcium carbonate can also be important, either structurally or as intermediate phases in biomineralization. Some biominerals include a mixture of these phases in distinct, organised structural components (e.g. bivalve shells). Carbonates are particularly prevalent in marine environments, but also present in freshwater and terrestrial organisms.

=== Phosphates ===
The most common biogenic phosphate is hydroxyapatite (HA), a calcium phosphate (Ca_{10}(PO_{4})_{6}(OH)_{2}) and a naturally occurring form of apatite. It is a primary constituent of bone, teeth, and fish scales. Bone is made primarily of HA crystals interspersed in a collagen matrix—65 to 70% of the mass of bone is HA. Similarly, HA is 70 to 80% of the mass of dentin and enamel in teeth. In enamel, the matrix for HA is formed by amelogenins and enamelins instead of collagen. Remineralisation of tooth enamel involves the reintroduction of mineral ions into demineralised enamel. Hydroxyapatite is the main mineral component of enamel in teeth. During demineralisation, calcium and phosphorus ions are drawn out from the hydroxyapatite. The mineral ions introduced during remineralisation restore the structure of the hydroxyapatite crystals.

The clubbing appendages of the peacock mantis shrimp are made of an extremely dense form of the mineral which has a higher specific strength; this has led to its investigation for potential synthesis and engineering use. Their dactyl appendages have excellent impact resistance due to the impact region being composed of mainly crystalline hydroxyapatite, which offers significant hardness. A periodic layer underneath the impact layer composed of hydroxyapatite with lower calcium and phosphorus content (thus resulting in a much lower modulus) inhibits crack growth by forcing new cracks to change directions. This periodic layer also reduces the energy transferred across both layers due to the large difference in modulus, even reflecting some of the incident energy.

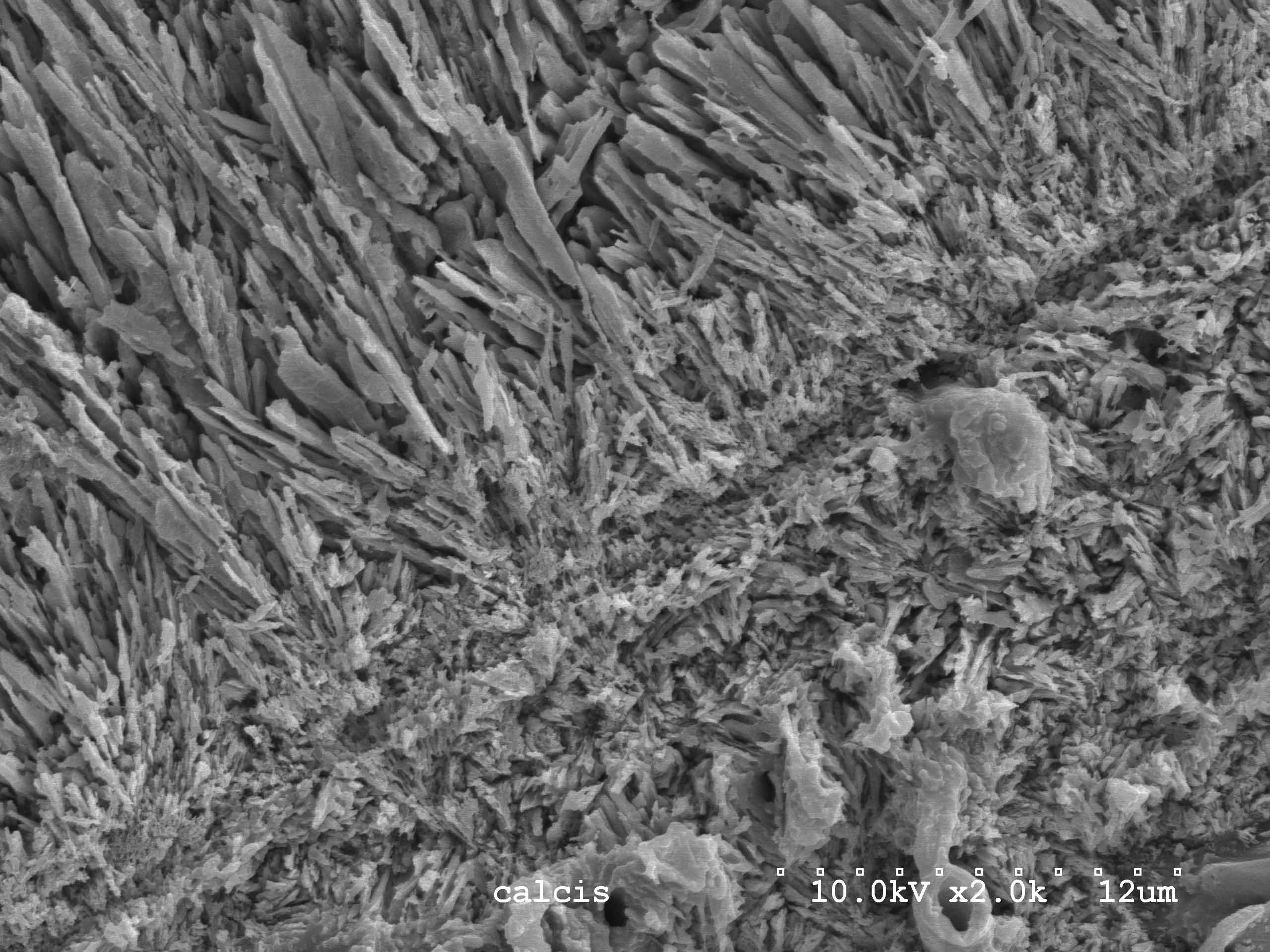
Glomerula piloseta (Sabellidae), longitudinal section of the tube showing aragonitic spherulitic prismatic structure

Composition	Example organisms
Calcium carbonate (calcite or aragonite)	Foraminifera; Coccolithophores; Calcareous sponge spicules; Corals; Archaeocyatha; Bryozoans; Brachiopod and mollusc shells; Echinoderms; Serpulidae
Silica (silicate/glass/opal)	Radiolarians; Diatoms; Most sponge spicules; Phytoliths in plants
Apatite (phosphate minerals)	Enamel (vertebrate teeth); Vertebrate bone; Conodonts; Linguliform brachiopod shells

=== Other minerals ===
Beyond these main three categories, there are a number of less-common types of biominerals, usually resulting from a need for specific physical properties or the organism inhabiting an unusual environment. For example, teeth that are primarily used for scraping hard substrates may be reinforced with particularly tough minerals, such as the iron minerals magnetite in chitons or goethite in limpets. Gastropod molluscs living close to hydrothermal vents reinforce their carbonate shells with the iron-sulfur minerals pyrite and greigite. Magnetotactic bacteria also employ magnetic iron minerals magnetite and greigite to produce magnetosomes to aid orientation and distribution in the sediments.

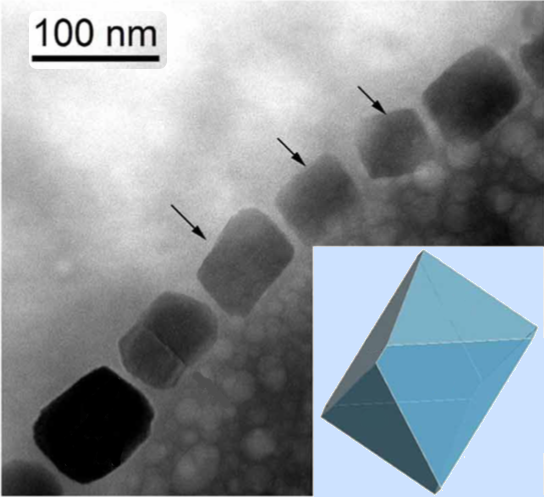
Magnetosome chain with octahedral habits modelled lower right

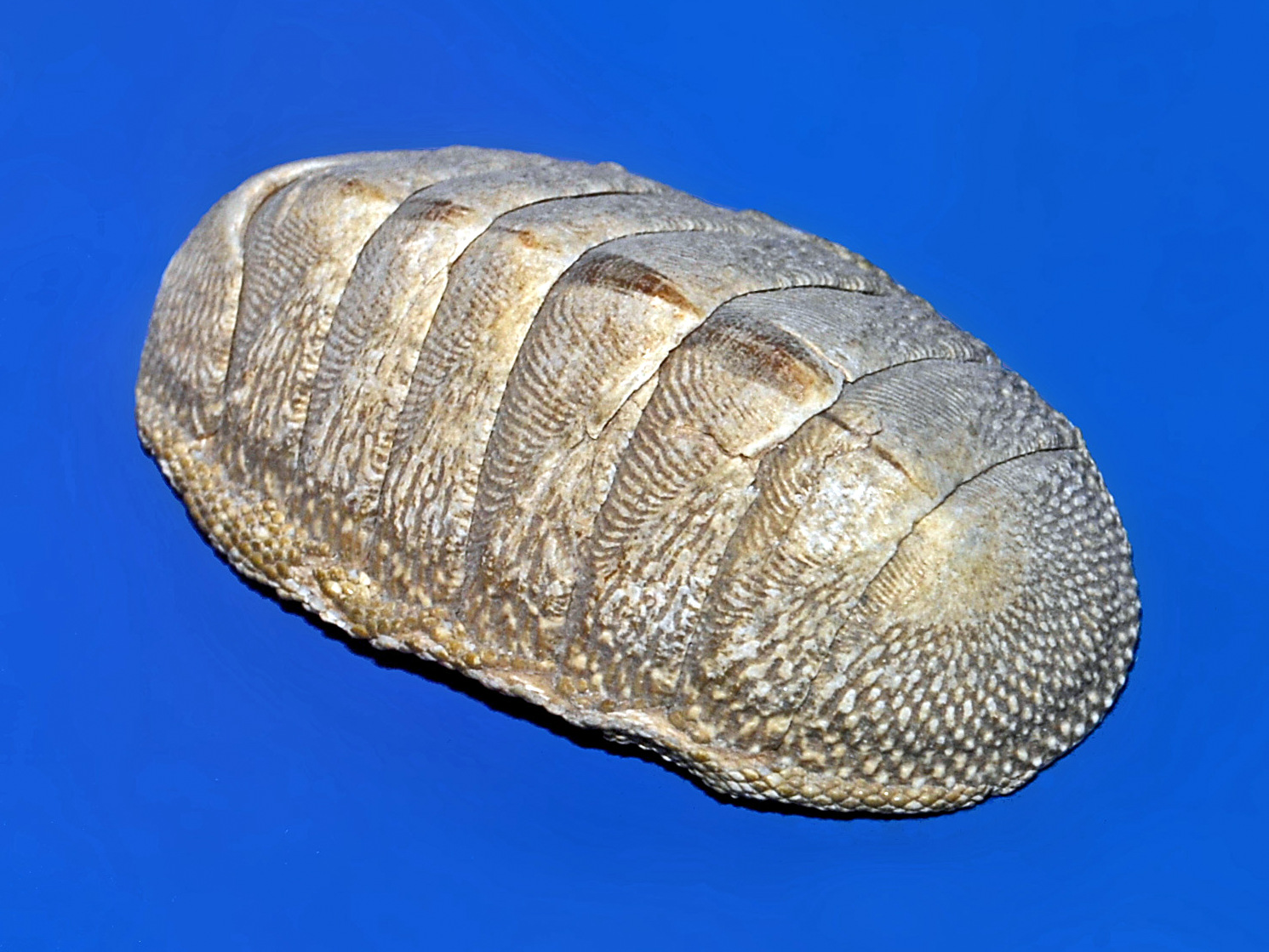
Chitons have aragonite shells and aragonite-based eyes, as well as teeth coated with magnetite.

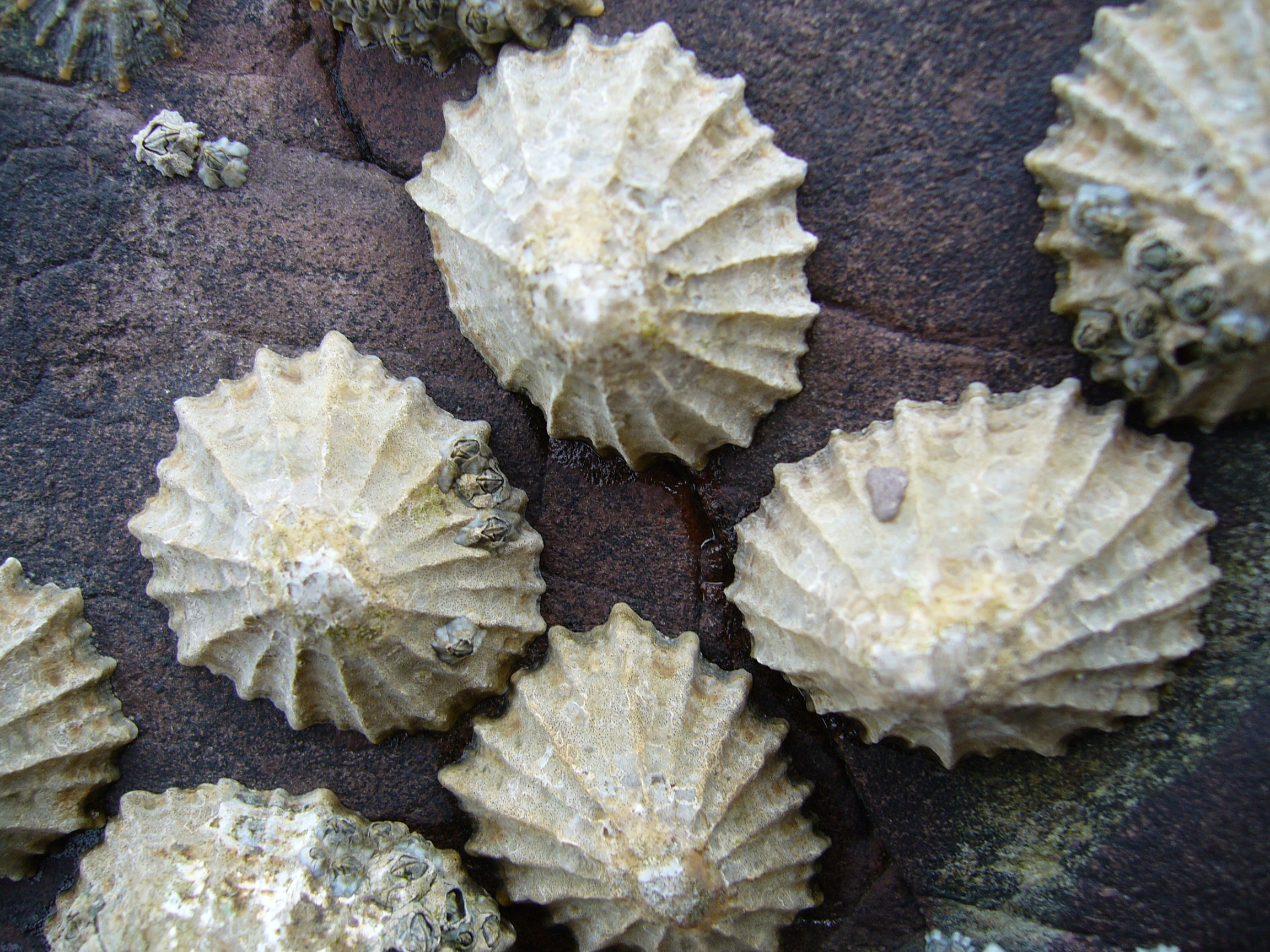
Limpets have carbonate shells and teeth reinforced with goethite.
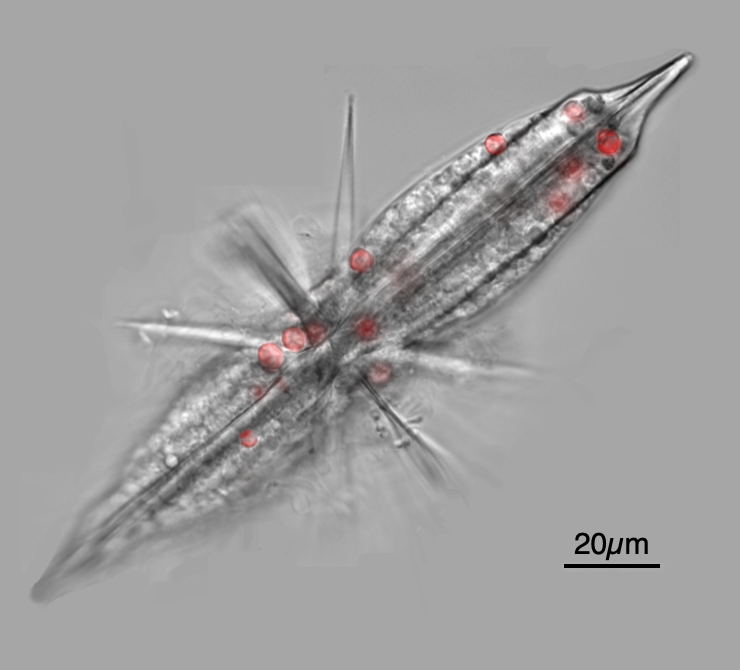
Acantharian radiolarians have celestine crystal shells.

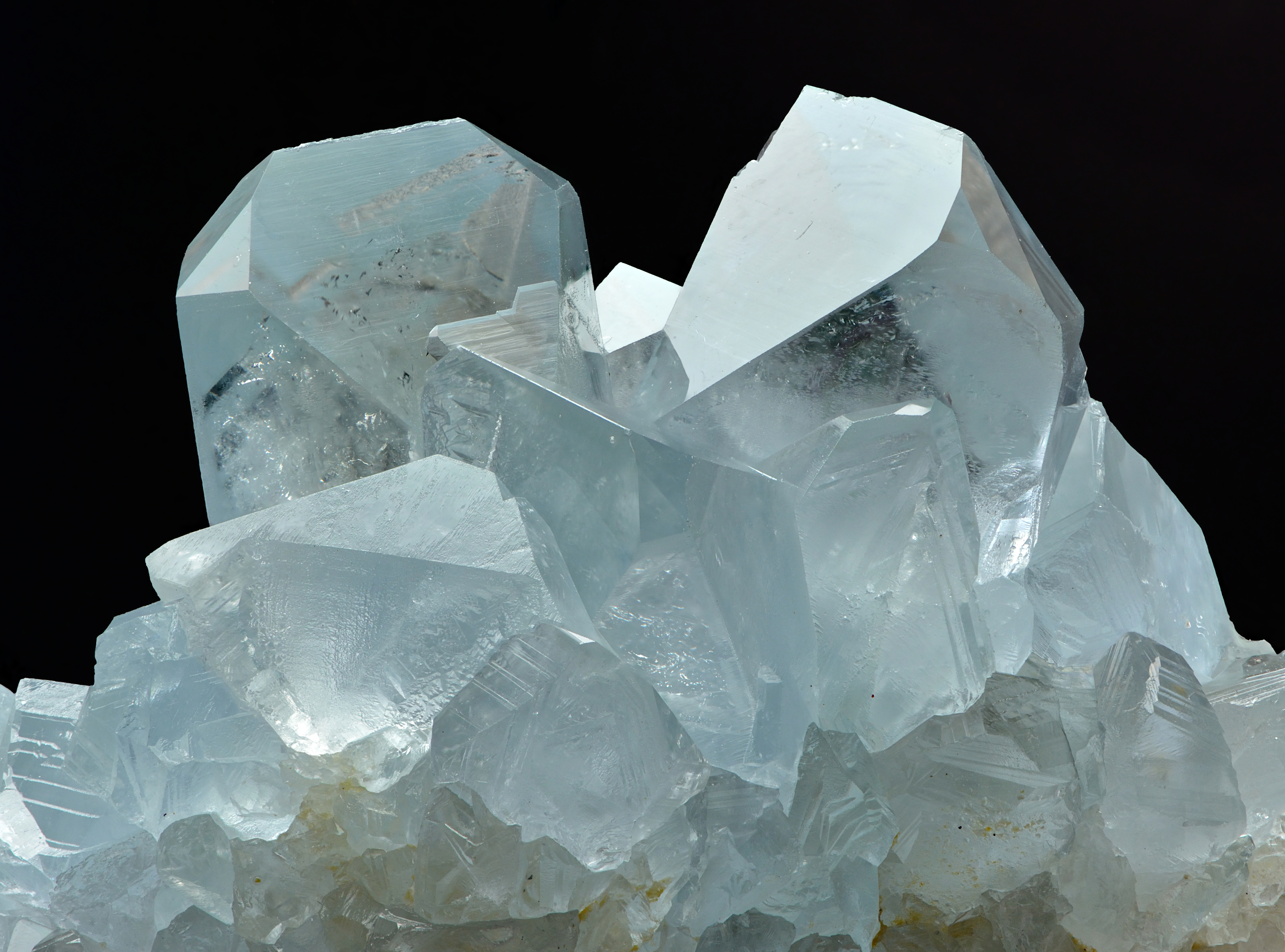
Celestine crystals, the heaviest mineral in the oceans

Celestine, the heaviest mineral in the ocean, consists of strontium sulfate, SrSO_{4}. The mineral is named for the delicate blue colour of its crystals. Planktic acantharean radiolarians form celestine crystal shells. The denseness of the celestite ensures their shells function as mineral ballast, resulting in fast sedimentation to bathypelagic depths. High settling fluxes of acantharian cysts have been observed at times in the Iceland Basin and the Southern Ocean, as much as half of the total gravitational organic carbon flux.

== Diversity ==
The most widespread biomineral is silica

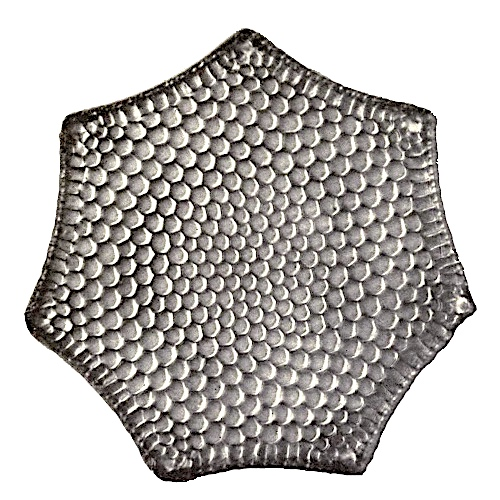
The siliceous diatom frustule has the highest strength of any known biological material.

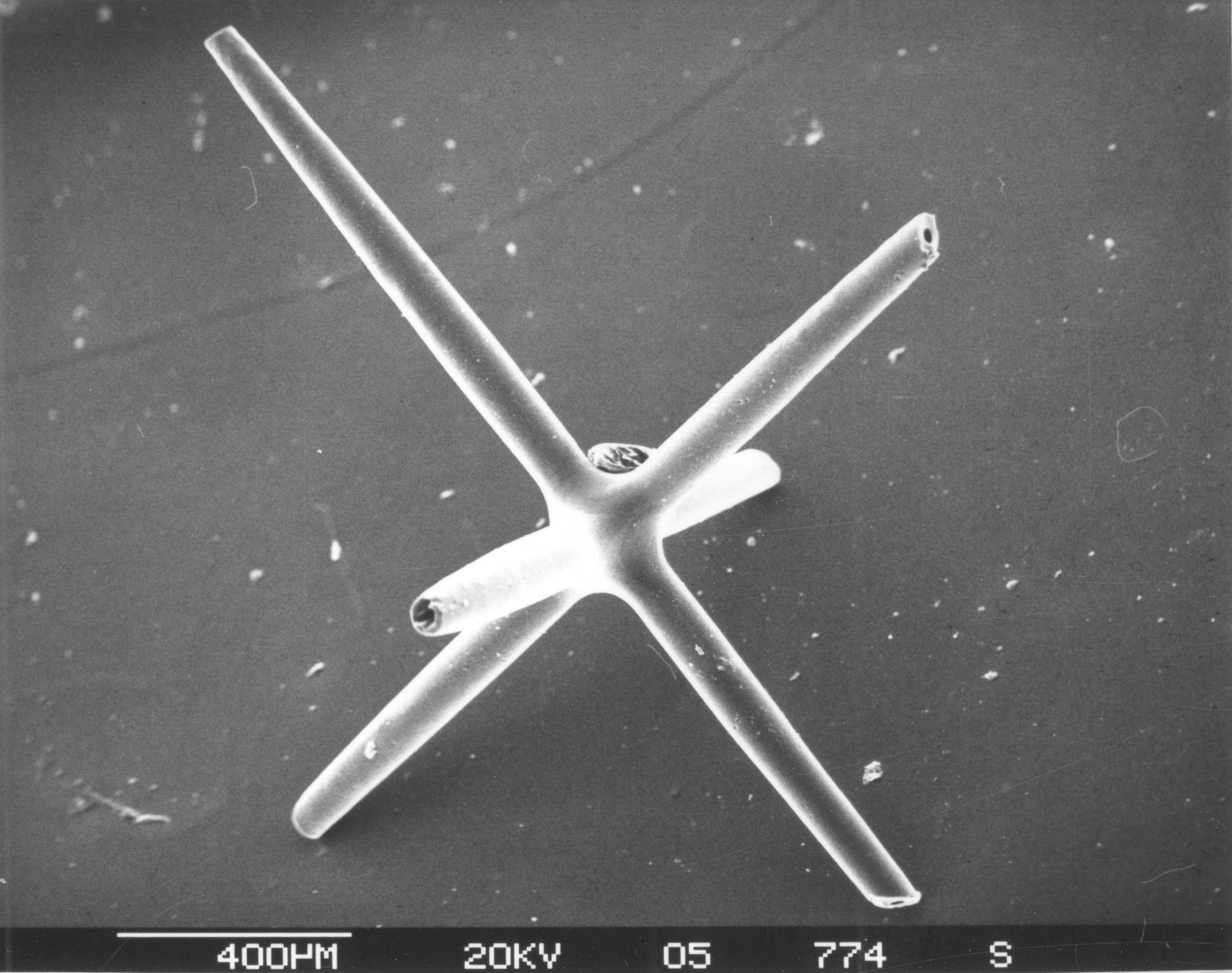
Sponge spicules, like this from a siliceous glass sponge, form structures many times more flexible than equivalent structures made of pure silica.

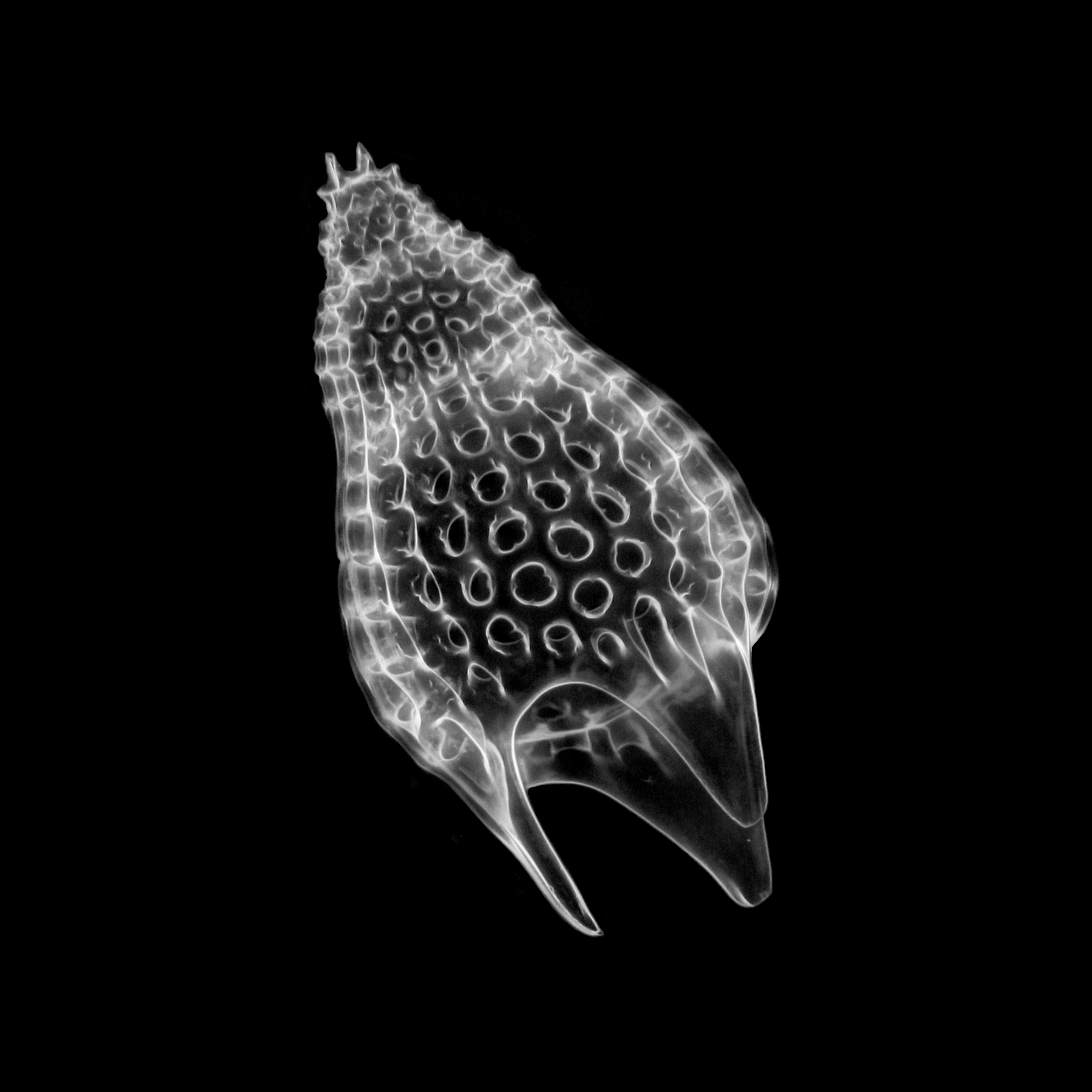
Transparent glass test or shell of a radiolarian

In nature, there is a wide array of biominerals, ranging from iron oxide to strontium sulfate, with calcareous biominerals being particularly notable. However, the most taxonomically widespread biomineral is silica (SiO_{2}·nH_{2}O), being present in all eukaryotic supergroups. Notwithstanding, the degree of silicification can vary even between closely related taxa, from being found in composite structures with other biominerals (e.g., limpet teeth; to forming minor structures (e.g., ciliate granules; or being a major structural constituent of the organism. The most extreme degree of silicification is evident in the diatoms, where almost all species have an obligate requirement for silicon to complete cell wall formation and cell division. Biogeochemically and ecologically, diatoms are the most important silicifiers in modern marine ecosystems, with radiolarians (polycystine and phaeodarian rhizarians), silicoflagellates (dictyochophyte and chrysophyte stramenopiles), and sponges with prominent roles as well. In contrast, the major silicifiers in terrestrial ecosystems are the land plants (embryophytes), with other silicifying groups (e.g., testate amoebae) having a minor role.

Broadly, biomineralized structures evolve and diversify when the energetic cost of biomineral production is less than the expense of producing an equivalent organic structure. The energetic costs of forming a silica structure from silicic acid are much less than forming the same volume from an organic structure (≈20-fold less than lignin or 10-fold less than polysaccharides like cellulose). Based on a structural model of biogenic silica, Lobel et al. (1996) identified by biochemical modeling a low-energy reaction pathway for nucleation and growth of silica. The combination of organic and inorganic components within biomineralized structures often results in enhanced properties compared to exclusively organic or inorganic materials. With respect to biogenic silica, this can result in the production of much stronger structures, such as siliceous diatom frustules having the highest strength per unit density of any known biological material, or sponge spicules being many times more flexible than an equivalent structure made of pure silica. As a result, biogenic silica structures are used for support, feeding, predation defense and environmental protection as a component of cyst walls. Biogenic silica also has useful optical properties for light transmission and modulation in organisms as diverse as plants, diatoms, sponges, and molluscs. There is also evidence that silicification is used as a detoxification response in snails and plants, biosilica has even been suggested to play a role as a pH buffer for the enzymatic activity of carbonic anhydrase, aiding the acquisition of inorganic carbon for photosynthesis.

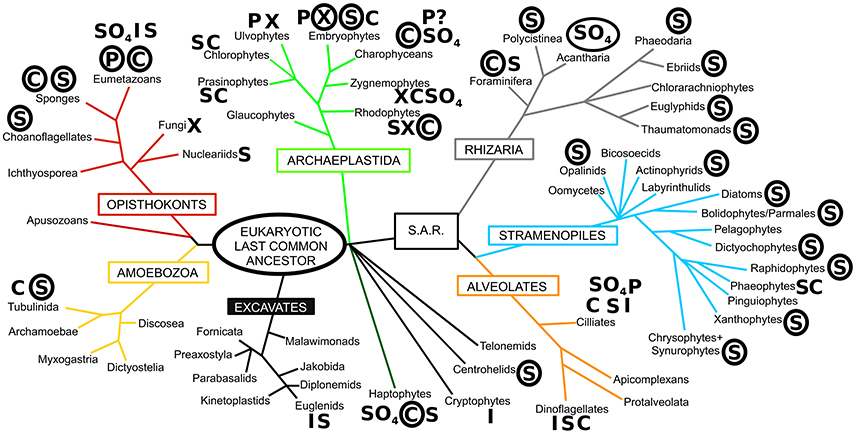
Diversity of biomineralization across the eukaryotes
The phylogeny shown in this diagram is based on Adl et al. (2012), with major eukaryotic supergroups named in boxes. Letters next to taxon names denote the presence of biomineralization, with circled letters indicating the prominent and widespread use of that biomineral. S, silica; C, calcium carbonate; P, calcium phosphate; I, iron (magnetite/goethite); X, calcium oxalate; SO_{4}, sulfates (calcium/barium/strontium), ? denotes uncertainty in the report.

There are questions which have yet to be resolved, such as why some organisms biomineralize while others do not, and why is there such a diversity of biominerals besides silicon when silicon is so abundant, comprising 28% of the Earth's crust. The answer to these questions lies in the evolutionary interplay between biomineralization and geochemistry, and in the competitive interactions that have arisen from these dynamics. Fundamentally whether an organism produces silica or not involves evolutionary trade-offs and competition between silicifiers themselves, and non-silicifying organisms (both those which use other biominerals, and non-mineralizing groups). Mathematical models and controlled experiments of resource competition in phytoplankton have demonstrated the rise to dominance of different algal species based on nutrient backgrounds in defined media. These have been part of fundamental studies in ecology. However, the vast diversity of organisms that thrive in a complex array of biotic and abiotic interactions in oceanic ecosystems are a challenge to such minimal models and experimental designs, whose parameterization and possible combinations, respectively, limit the interpretations that can be built on them.

== Evolution ==
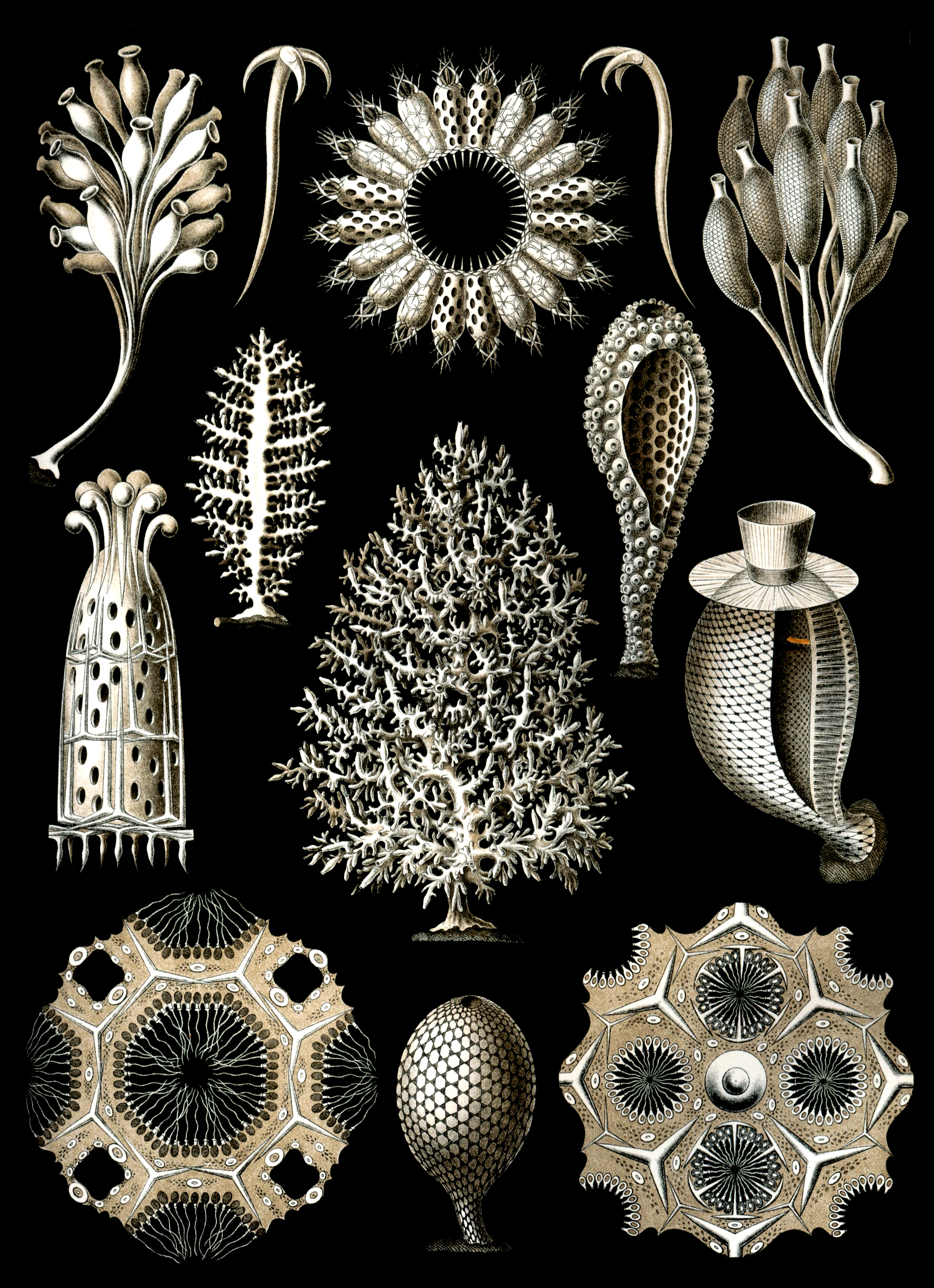
Some calcareous sponges (Ernst Haeckel, Kunstformen der Natur)

The first evidence of biomineralization dates to some 750 million years ago, and sponge-grade organisms may have formed calcite skeletons 630 million years ago. But in most lineages, biomineralization first occurred in the Cambrian or Ordovician periods. Organisms used whichever form of calcium carbonate was more stable in the water column at the point in time when they became biomineralized, and stuck with that form for the remainder of their biological history (but see for a more detailed analysis). The stability is dependent on the Ca/Mg ratio of seawater, which is thought to be controlled primarily by the rate of sea floor spreading, although atmospheric CO_{2} levels may also play a role.

Biomineralization evolved multiple times, independently, and most animal lineages first expressed biomineralized components in the Cambrian period. Many of the same processes are used in unrelated lineages, which suggests that biomineralization machinery was assembled from pre-existing "off-the-shelf" components already used for other purposes in the organism. Although the biomachinery facilitating biomineralization is complex – involving signalling transmitters, inhibitors, and transcription factors – many elements of this 'toolkit' are shared between phyla as diverse as corals, molluscs, and vertebrates. The shared components tend to perform quite fundamental tasks, such as designating that cells will be used to create the minerals, whereas genes controlling more finely tuned aspects that occur later in the biomineralization process, such as the precise alignment and structure of the crystals produced, tend to be uniquely evolved in different lineages. This suggests that Precambrian organisms were employing the same elements, albeit for a different purpose – perhaps to avoid the inadvertent precipitation of calcium carbonate from the supersaturated Proterozoic oceans. Forms of mucus that are involved in inducing mineralization in most animal lineages appear to have performed such an anticalcifatory function in the ancestral state. Further, certain proteins that would originally have been involved in maintaining calcium concentrations within cells are homologous in all animals, and appear to have been co-opted into biomineralization after the divergence of the animal lineages. The galaxins are one probable example of a gene being co-opted from a different ancestral purpose into controlling biomineralization, in this case, being 'switched' to this purpose in the Triassic scleractinian corals; the role performed appears to be functionally identical to that of the unrelated pearlin gene in molluscs. Carbonic anhydrase serves a role in mineralization broadly in the animal kingdom, including in sponges, implying an ancestral role. Far from being a rare trait that evolved a few times and remained stagnant, biomineralization pathways in fact evolved many times and are still evolving rapidly today; even within a single genus, it is possible to detect great variation within a single gene family.

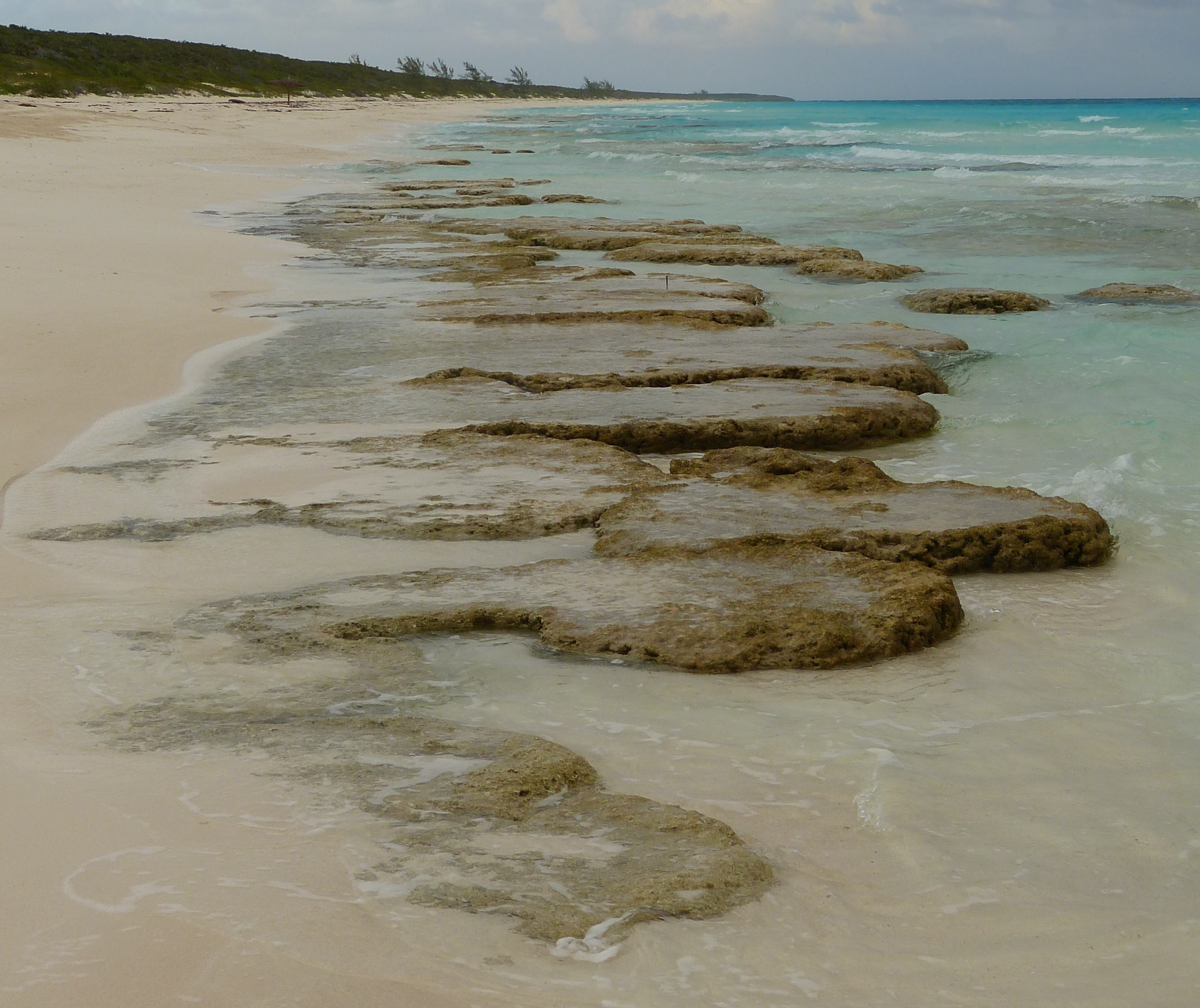
Stromatolites made by bacteria. Fossilized stromatolites record some of the earliest life.

The homology of biomineralization pathways is underlined by a remarkable experiment whereby the nacreous layer of a molluscan shell was implanted into a human tooth, and rather than experiencing an immune response, the molluscan nacre was incorporated into the host bone matrix. This points to the exaptation of an original biomineralization pathway. The biomineralisation capacity of brachiopods and molluscs has also been demonstrated to be homologous, building on a conserved set of genes.

The most ancient example of biomineralization, dating back 2 billion years, is the deposition of magnetite, which is observed in some bacteria, as well as the teeth of chitons and the brains of vertebrates; it is possible that this pathway, which performed a magnetosensory role in the common ancestor of all bilaterians, was duplicated and modified in the Cambrian to form the basis for calcium-based biomineralization pathways. Iron is stored in close proximity to magnetite-coated chiton teeth, so that the teeth can be renewed as they wear. Not only is there a marked similarity between the magnetite deposition process and enamel deposition in vertebrates, but some vertebrates even have comparable iron storage facilities near their teeth.

== Potential applications ==
Most traditional approaches to the synthesis of nanoscale materials are energy inefficient, requiring stringent conditions (e.g., high temperature, pressure, or pH), and often produce toxic byproducts. Furthermore, the quantities produced are small, and the resultant material is usually irreproducible because of the difficulties in controlling agglomeration. In contrast, materials produced by organisms have properties that usually surpass those of analogous synthetically manufactured materials with similar phase composition. Biological materials are assembled in aqueous environments under mild conditions by using macromolecules. Organic macromolecules collect and transport raw materials and assemble these substrates and into short- and long-range ordered composites with consistency and uniformity.

The aim of biomimetics is to mimic the natural way of producing minerals such as apatites. Many man-made crystals require elevated temperatures and strong chemical solutions, whereas the organisms have long been able to lay down elaborate mineral structures at ambient temperatures. Often, the mineral phases are not pure but are made as composites that entail an organic part, often protein, which takes part in and controls the biomineralization. These composites are often not only as hard as the pure mineral but also tougher, as the micro-environment controls biomineralization.

=== Architecture ===
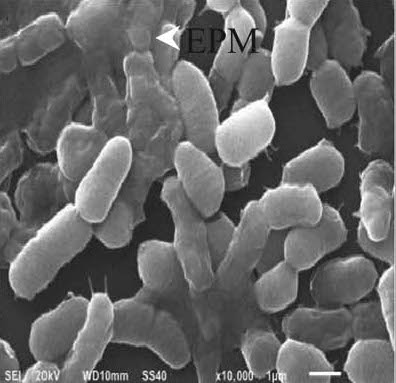
Bacillus megaterium

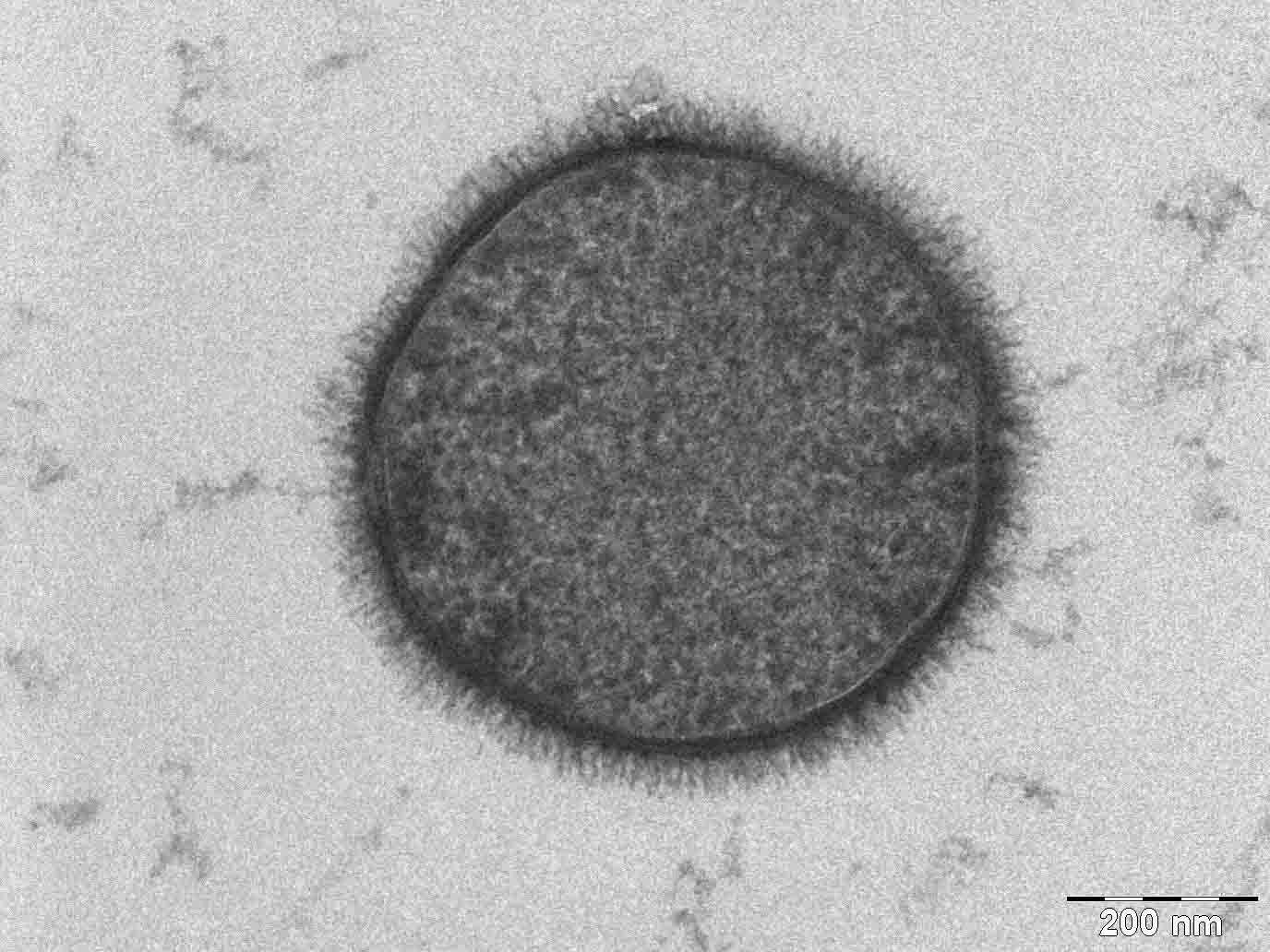
Bacillus subtilis

One biological system that might be of key importance in the future development of architecture is bacterial biofilm. The term biofilm refers to complex heterogeneous structures comprising different populations of microorganisms that attach and form a community on inert (e.g. rocks, glass, plastic) or organic (e.g. skin, cuticle, mucosa) surfaces.

The properties of the surface, such as charge, hydrophobicity, and roughness, determine initial bacterial attachment. A common principle of all biofilms is the production of extracellular matrix (ECM) composed of different organic substances, such as extracellular proteins, exopolysaccharides, and nucleic acids. While the ability to generate ECM appears to be a common feature of multicellular bacterial communities, the means by which these matrices are constructed and function are diverse.

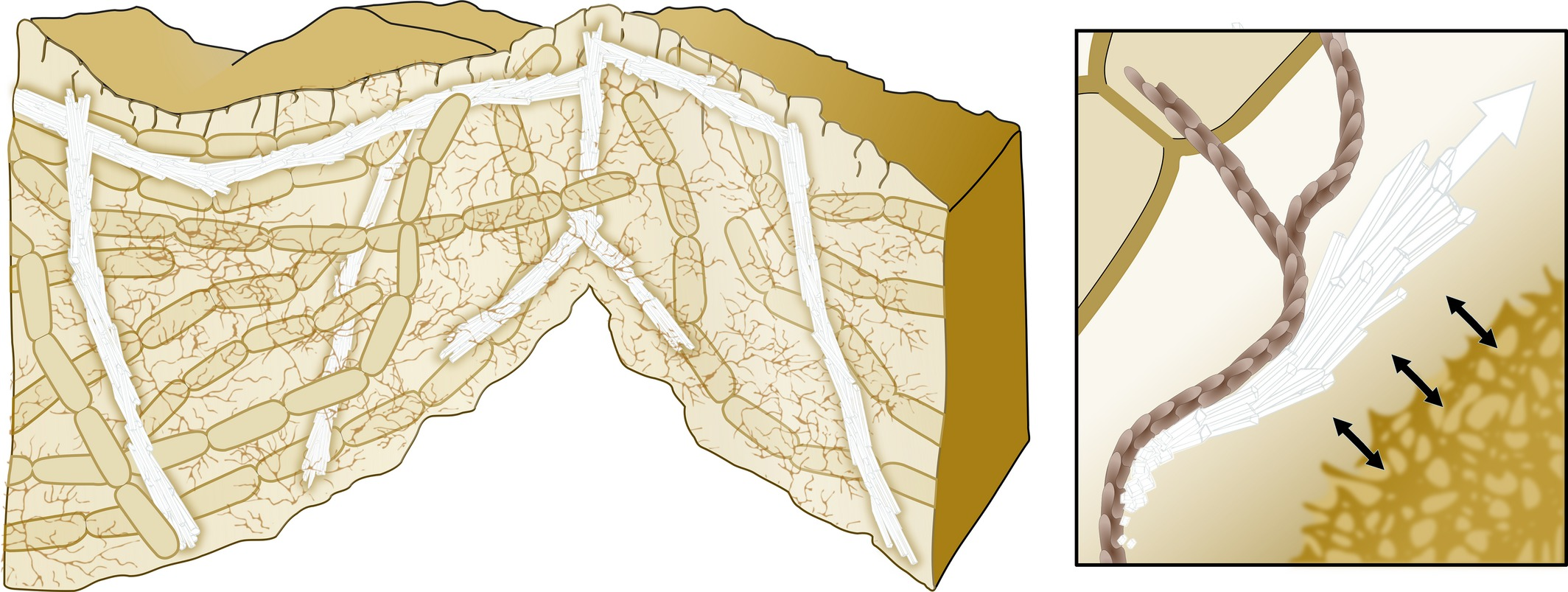
Model for biomineralization-mediated scaffolding
of bacterial biofilms
A directed growth of the calcium carbonate crystals allows mechanical support of the 3D structure. The bacterial extracellular matrix (brown) promotes the crystals' growth in specific directions.

Bacterially induced calcium carbonate precipitation can be used to produce "self-healing" concrete. Bacillus megaterium spores and suitable dried nutrients are mixed and applied to steel-reinforced concrete. When the concrete cracks, water ingress dissolves the nutrients and the bacteria germinate triggering calcium carbonate precipitation, resealing the crack and protecting the steel reinforcement from corrosion. This process can also be used to manufacture new hard materials, such as bio-cement.

However, the full potential of bacteria-driven biomineralization is yet to be realized, as it is currently used as a passive filling rather than as a smart designable material. A future challenge is to develop ways to control the timing and the location of mineral formation, as well as the physical properties of the mineral itself, by environmental input. Bacillus subtilis has already been shown to respond to its environment, by changing the production of its ECM. It uses the polymers produced by single cells during biofilm formation as a physical cue to coordinate ECM production by the bacterial community.

=== Uranium contaminants ===
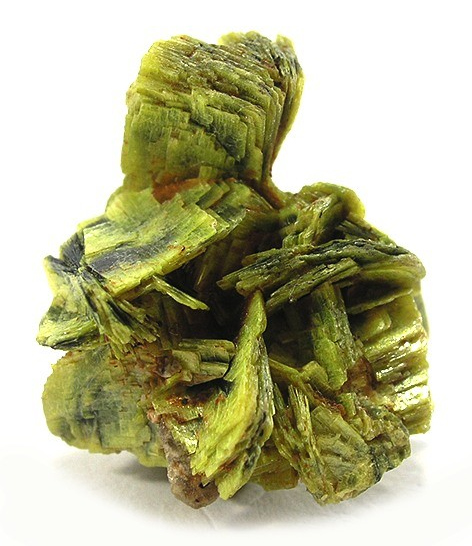
Autunite crystal

Biomineralization may be used to remediate groundwater contaminated with uranium. The biomineralization of uranium primarily involves the precipitation of uranium phosphate minerals associated with the release of phosphate by microorganisms. Negatively charged ligands at the surface of the cells attract the positively charged uranyl ion (UO_{2}^{2+}). If the concentrations of phosphate and UO_{2}^{2+} are sufficiently high, minerals such as autunite (Ca(UO_{2})_{2}(PO_{4})_{2}•10-12H_{2}O) or polycrystalline HUO_{2}PO_{4} may form thus reducing the mobility of UO_{2}^{2+}. Compared to the direct addition of inorganic phosphate to contaminated groundwater, biomineralization has the advantage that the ligands produced by microbes will target uranium compounds more specifically rather than react actively with all aqueous metals. Stimulating bacterial phosphatase activity to liberate phosphate under controlled conditions limits the rate of bacterial hydrolysis of organophosphate and the release of phosphate to the system, thus avoiding clogging of the injection location with metal phosphate minerals. The high concentration of ligands near the cell surface also provides nucleation foci for precipitation, which leads to higher efficiency than chemical precipitation.

== Biogenic mineral controversy ==
The geological definition of mineral normally excludes compounds that occur only in living beings. However, some minerals are often biogenic (such as calcite) or are organic compounds in the sense of chemistry (such as mellite). Moreover, living beings often synthesize inorganic minerals (such as hydroxylapatite) that also occur in rocks.

The International Mineralogical Association (IMA) is the generally recognized standard body for the definition and nomenclature of mineral species. As of December 2020, the IMA recognizes 5,650 official mineral species out of 5,862 proposed or traditional ones.

The IMA's decision to exclude biogenic crystalline substances is a topic of contention among geologists and mineralogists. For example, Lowenstam (1981) stated that "organisms are capable of forming a diverse array of minerals, some of which cannot be formed inorganically in the biosphere."

Skinner (2005) views all solids as potential minerals and includes biominerals in the mineral kingdom, which are created by organisms' metabolic activities. Skinner expanded the previous definition of a mineral to classify "element or compound, amorphous or crystalline, formed through biogeochemical processes," as a mineral.

Recent advances in high-resolution genetics and X-ray absorption spectroscopy are providing revelations on the biogeochemical relations between microorganisms and minerals that may shed new light on this question. For example, the IMA-commissioned "Working Group on Environmental Mineralogy and Geochemistry " deals with minerals in the hydrosphere, atmosphere, and biosphere. The group's scope includes mineral-forming microorganisms, which exist on nearly every rock, soil, and particle surface spanning the globe to depths of at least 1,600 metres below the sea floor and 70 kilometres into the stratosphere (possibly entering the mesosphere).

Biogeochemical cycles have contributed to the formation of minerals for billions of years. Microorganisms can precipitate metals from solution, contributing to the formation of ore deposits. They can also catalyze the dissolution of minerals.

Before the International Mineralogical Association's listing, over 60 biominerals had been discovered, named, and published. These minerals (a sub-set tabulated in Lowenstam (1981)) are considered minerals proper according to Skinner's (2005) definition. These biominerals are not listed in the International Mineral Association official list of mineral names, however, many of these biomineral representatives are distributed among the 78 mineral classes listed in the Dana classification scheme.

Skinner's (2005) definition of a mineral considers this matter by stating that a mineral can be crystalline or amorphous. Although biominerals are not the most common form of minerals, they help to define the limits of what constitutes a mineral properly. Nickel's (1995) formal definition explicitly mentioned crystallinity as a key to defining a substance as a mineral. A 2011 article defined icosahedrite, an aluminium-iron-copper alloy as mineral; named for its unique natural icosahedral symmetry, it is a quasicrystal. Unlike a true crystal, quasicrystals are ordered but not periodic.

== List of minerals ==
Examples of biogenic minerals include:

- Apatite in bones and teeth
- Aragonite, calcite, fluorite in vestibular systems (part of the inner ear) of vertebrates
- Aragonite and calcite in travertine and biogenic silica (siliceous sinter, opal) deposited through algal action
- Goethite found as filaments in limpet teeth
- Hydroxyapatite formed by mitochondria
- Magnetite and greigite formed by magnetotactic bacteria
- Oxalate and calcium carbonate raphides, silica bodies, strontium and barium sulfate in some plants
- Pyrite and marcasite in sedimentary rocks deposited by sulfate-reducing bacteria
- Quartz formed from bacterial action on fossil fuels (gas, oil, coal)

== Astrobiology ==
Biominerals could be important indicators of extraterrestrial life and thus could play an essential role in the search for past or present life on Mars. Furthermore, organic components (biosignatures) that are often associated with biominerals are believed to play crucial roles in both pre-biotic and biotic reactions.

On 24 January 2014, NASA reported that current studies by the Curiosity and Opportunity rovers on the planet Mars will now be searching for evidence of ancient life, including a biosphere based on autotrophic, chemotrophic and chemolithoautotrophic microorganisms, as well as ancient water, including fluvio-lacustrine environments (plains related to ancient rivers or lakes) that may have been habitable. The search for evidence of habitability, taphonomy (related to fossils), and organic carbon on the planet Mars is now a primary NASA objective.

== See also ==
- Biocrystallization
- Biofilm
- Biointerface
- Biomineralising polychaetes
- Bone mineral
- Microbiologically induced calcite precipitation
- Micropaleontology
- Mineralized tissues
- Phytolith
- Raphide and Druse (botany)
- Susannah M. Porter history of biomineralization
- Malcolm L. Snead Researcher on amelogenin and dental enamel biomineralization
