= C8H18O =

The molecular formula C_{8}H_{18}O (molar mass: 130.23 g/mol) may refer to:

- Di-tert-butyl ether
- Dibutyl ether
- 2-Ethylhexanol
- Octanols
  - 1-Octanol
  - 2-Octanol
  - 3-Octanol
