= C8H11NO2 =

The molecular formula C_{8}H_{11}NO_{2} may refer to:

- Butyl cyanoacrylate
- 4-Deoxypyridoxine
- Dopamine, a neurotransmitter
- Isobutyl cyanoacrylate
- Norfenefrine
- Octopamine
- Vanillylamine
