= Enamel hypocalcification =

Defect of tooth enamel when it is softer than normal

Enamel is the outermost layer of the tooth which serves as a protective layer from physical, thermal, and chemical damage. Ameloblasts are the cells that produce the enamel. Their life cycle, known as amelogenesis, is divided into six stages: morphogenic, organizing, formative, maturative, protective, and desmolytic. Enamel mineralization occurs during the maturation stage. Hence, defects in the maturation stage result in hypocalcification or hypomineralization. Enamel hypocalcification is the inadequate deposition of inorganic ions, resulting in the appearance of translucency, white-chalky spots, and yellow-brown discoloration on the surface of the tooth associated with increased sensitivity and a higher risk of developing dental caries.

Enamel hypocalcification is a multifactorial disease that targets both primary and permanent dentition and is influenced by local, systemic, environmental, and genetic effects. For instance, trauma, infection, radiation, fluorosis, amelogenesis imperfecta, and molar incisor hypomineralization are among the causing factors of enamel hypocalcification.

== Pathophysiology ==
Enamel hypoplasia (weak or thin enamel) has been found in the cases of hereditary vitamin D-dependent rickets and hypoparathyroidism, both of which are associated with low calcium levels (hypocalcemia). Since calcium is essential for proper enamel development, a deficiency can lead to defects in enamel formation. However, enamel hypoplasia has not been observed in X-linked hypophosphatemic rickets, where calcium levels remain normal despite phosphate regulation issues. No link was found between enamel hypoplasia and plasma phosphate levels. Enamel hypoplasia is often seen in children with low calcium levels, such as those with vitamin D deficiency, prematurity, or neonatal tetany. Enamel defects can help pinpoint when calcium levels dropped by linking them to enamel development in conditions like hypoparathyroidism or rickets.

=== Hereditary ===
In contrast, some individuals and families may predominantly or exclusively exhibit a hypomineralisation phenotype. Earlier classifications have divided these defects into two categories:

Hypocalcification defects; which suggest a more severe mineralization issue, and hypomaturation defects; which indicate a milder degree of hypomineralisation.

While this distinction may be valid in extreme cases, it is often challenging to determine the more accurate term in most situations. Given how complex enamel formation is, this approach makes sense until researchers understand the molecular and protein pathways involved in the process. In severe cases of demineralization, the enamel becomes soft and prone to damage, leading to smaller teeth with increased sensitivity. Some cases may exhibit both enamel hypoplasia and demineralization. As a result, affected individuals may have smaller teeth with thinner enamel, small crowns, spacing, and a yellowish-brown discoloration due to the combined mineralization defect.

=== Dental fluorosis ===
Dental fluorosis is a condition that occurs when a person consumes too much fluoride while their teeth are still developing. This usually happens during childhood, before the permanent teeth fully form. The severity of dental fluorosis depends on how much fluoride a person is exposed to, how long they are exposed to it, and their genetic makeup. Scientists believe that when there is too much fluoride in the body, it interferes with the natural process of tooth development, specifically by affecting proteins in the enamel. This results in enamel that is not as strong or well-mineralized as it should be, making the teeth appear discolored or streaked.

The critical period for developing dental fluorosis is from birth until around eight years of age. This is the time when the enamel of the permanent teeth is still forming under the gums. Once the teeth have fully developed and emerged into the mouth, consuming extra fluoride will not cause fluorosis. The visible signs of this condition, such as white streaks, spots, or even brown discoloration, are more likely to appear when the fluoride levels in drinking water exceed 1.5 parts per million (ppm), which is a way to measure fluoride concentration.

In many places, fluoride is added to public drinking water to help prevent cavities. The recommended level for fluoridated water is usually around 1 ppm, which is considered effective for reducing tooth decay while keeping the risk of fluorosis low.

== Causes ==
=== Environmental factor ===
Excessive fluoride intake disrupts the mineral content of the enamel, causing it to become porous and hypomineralized, which can result in white or brown spots on the teeth.

=== Nutritional disturbances and childhood illness ===
Enamel hypocalcification can also be influenced by nutritional deficiencies, especially a lack of vitamins D and A, and minerals such as calcium and phosphorus. These nutrients are essential in the early stages of tooth development for maintaining enamel strength and integrity. Vitamin D deficiency, for example, can impair calcium absorption, which is critical for enamel mineralization. Inadequate levels of these nutrients result in hypomineralized enamel that is softer, more porous, and prone to defects such as hypocalcification as these nutrients are essential for proper enamel formation. Additionally, childhood illnesses and medications like tetracycline, if taken during the enamel development phase, may disrupt the mineral balance, contributing to hypocalcifications.

=== Genetic factors ===
On the genetic side, amelogenesis imperfecta is a primary contributor to enamel hypocalcification. This inherited disorder affects the formation and structure of enamel, leading to defects such as pitted, discolored, or abnormally thin enamel that is prone to rapid wear and breakage. Mutations in genes like FAM83H, which provides instructions for proteins in ameloblasts (cells responsible for enamel production), can lead to hypocalcified enamel. These genetic mutations cause incomplete or improper mineralization, resulting in fragile enamel that does not effectively protect the teeth, increasing susceptibility to damage. Together, these environmental and genetic factors contribute to the development of enamel hypocalcification.

== Types of enamel hypocalcification and hypomineralization ==
Enamel hypocalcification and hypomineralization are defects in the quality and structure of dental enamel, and therefore, disruption during enamel development affects its hardness, color, and resilience. The defects can have different clinical manifestations and causes, resulting in enamel that easily breaks down, is more sensitive, and is likely to undergo discoloration.

=== Classification based on clinical appearance ===
The classification focuses on how the affected enamel appears visually and how it responds to stress after eruption as different patterns of enamel hypomineralization (hypocalcification) are identifiable depending on their clinical presentation.

=== Diffuse opacities ===
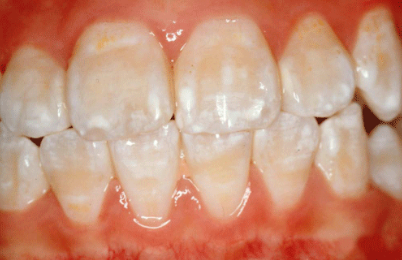
White spot lesion can be seen across all teeth on the enamel.

Diffuse opacities present as milky-white, chalky areas that spread across a tooth surface without clear borders as a result of a generalized decrease in the mineral content of the enamel which doesn't involve localized breakdown. The enamel may appear slightly porous and have a matte texture. Teeth with diffuse opacities may be aesthetically compromised even as they remain structurally intact and the condition is associated with mild systemic issues during enamel formation like nutritional deficiencies and mild illness.

=== Demarcated Opacities ===
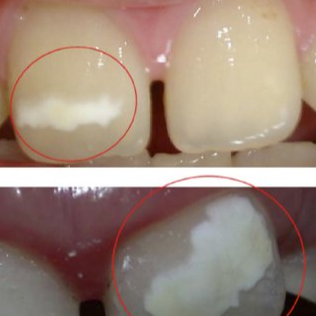

Demarcated opacities are areas that appear distinctly different from the surrounding enamel as there can be variations in pigmentation (appearing white, yellow, or brown), which is a suggestion of possible localized defects in enamel mineralization. The yellow and brown variations are more likely to undergo further breakdown whereas the white opacities may remain intact though cosmetically noticeable. Nevertheless, demarcated opacities indicate disruptions in enamel formation at specific times and are linked to acute illness and trauma during childhood.

=== Post-eruptive Breakdown ===
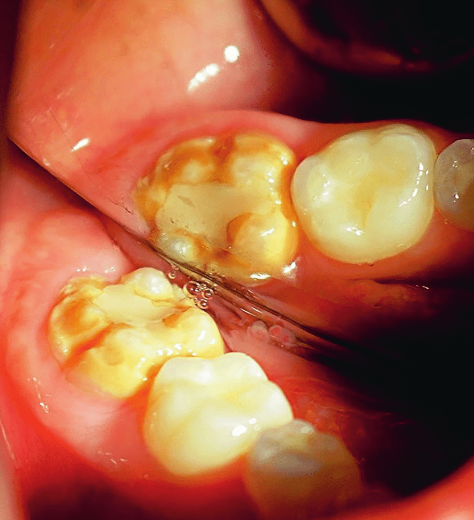

Breakdown occurs as a result of severe hypomineralization of the enamel as the enamel appears intact in the initial stages but gradually chips and fractures after the tooth erupts due to the weakened mineral content, leading to the formation of rough surfaces and cavities which makes the tooth highly vulnerable to undergo wear, decay and sensitivity. Notably, the post-eruptive breakdown is linked to severe forms of hypomineralization like molar incisor hypomineralization (MIH).

=== Classification based on the affected teeth ===
==== Molar incisor hypomineralization (MIH) ====
MIH is a specific pattern for which first permanent molars and permanent incisors are affected with the presence of demarcated opacities on the teeth with variations in color from white to yellow and brown. The enamel which is affected becomes weaker and hence the teeth becomes highly sensitive and likely to undergo post-eruptive breakdown. Notably, the severity of MIH varies among individuals as some experience minimal discomfort and others require extensive dental treatment. Despite MIH remaining idiopathic, it is linked to systemic factors like childhood illnesses, antibiotic use, and nutritional stress during early tooth development.

==== Generalized hypomineralization ====
Multiple teeth across the dental arch are affected in generalized hypomineralization and the pattern could be due to systemic factors that influence enamel formation over a prolonged period like chronic illnesses, malnutrition, and premature birth. It manifests as diffuse opacities with some parts vulnerable to post-eruptive breakdown. Generalized hypomineralization occurs in primary and permanent teeth, and the variation in severity depends on the underlying cause and the duration of exposure to the disruptive factors.

== Etiological classification ==
=== Genetic factors ===
Genetic mutations could be a contributing factor to the development of enamel defects as they affect enamel formation. Conditions like amelogenesis imperfecta (AI), in which mutations in enamel-specific genes disrupt the normal enamel development, falls within this category. AI affects primary and permanent teeth leading to various forms of enamel defects like hypomineralization and hypocalcification and the affected teeth appear discolored, brittle and highly prone to wear, as the severity and appearance of the defects is based on the specific gene mutation with certain forms resulting in thin and poorly mineralized enamel, and others having normal enamel thickness with poor mineral quality. It is important for families to go through genetic screening to identify the defective genes so that families can be guided to take the mitigative measures to enhance dental health.

=== Environmental factors ===
Environmental factors during early childhood like fever, severe illness and trauma during critical stages of enamel development can disrupt enamel formation leading to hypomineralization. Illnesses like pneumonia and measles can disrupt mineralization of the enamel and result in demarcated opacities and post-eruptive breakdown. Additionally, maternal health during pregnancy like malnutrition and infections can also affect enamel formation in the developing fetus leading to a generalized hypomineralization. It is recommended that maternal health needs to be ensured at any stage during the pregnancy as well as the prevention of early childhood illnesses as one of the environmental factors contributing to enamel hypocalcification and hypomineralization.

=== Chemical exposure ===
Enamel defects can be a result of excessive exposure to certain chemicals like fluoride (dental fluorosis) due to ingestion of high levels of fluoride during tooth development in children with manifestations like diffuse opacities (the tooth having a chalky white appearance). As much as mild fluorosis is an aesthetic concern, severe cases of fluorosis result in pitted enamel that undergo staining. Exposure to chemicals from other sources like certain medications and environmental pollutants can also affect enamel formation, though it's less common than fluoride-related defects. It is important to take note of the toothpaste that children use for dental washing as well as the type of treatment that drinking water undergo to prevent the defect associated with fluoride exposure. The mitigation of the aesthetic and functional challenges associated with the various enamel defects require early diagnosis and preventive care as it ensure better oral health outcomes.

== Signs and symptoms ==
Enamel hypocalcification is characterized by the presence of white spots or streaks on the teeth due to reduced mineral content, posing both cosmetic concerns and potential structural weaknesses. White spots can also be seen in patients. As the enamel undergoes demineralization, it becomes thinner, often leading to yellow or brown discoloration. The severity of this discoloration can range from mild yellowing to more pronounced brown staining, reflecting the extent of enamel loss. This compromised enamel layer can also heighten tooth sensitivity to temperature changes and sugary foods, as external stimuli more easily reach the pulp, causing discomfort. Additionally, individuals with enamel hypocalcification experience a higher incidence of dental caries, as the weakened enamel provides less resistance to acid produced by oral bacteria.

== Clinical manifestations ==
Enamel hypocalcification is characterized by visible defects in the enamel, often manifesting as white spot lesions or brown discolorations. In cases such as dental fluorosis, this may include mottled patterns on the enamel surface which vary in appearance and extent based on the severity of the condition. In advanced cases, the mottled appearance of the enamel can expose the underlying dentin, creating an uneven and sometimes porous surface. Though the matrix of the enamel initially forms to a typical thickness, the mineralization or calcification process is incomplete or deficient, leading to softer and structurally compromised enamel.

This compromised enamel is more susceptible to staining due to its rougher surface texture and increased permeability, which allows pigments and external elements to penetrate more easily. The weakened enamel may begin to wear away, especially on the occlusal surfaces of the molars, where mechanical forces are most intense. In some individuals affected by severe enamel hypocalcification, the structural deficiencies also contribute to anterior open bite where the upper and lower front teeth do not meet when biting down. This malocclusion can further complicate both functional and aesthetic aspects of the dentition.

== Management and conclusion ==
Several factors must be assessed prior to deciding a tailored treatment option for individuals. This includes age, severity of MIH, restorability of tooth, presence or absence of pulpal involvement, prognosis, and cost.

The use of fluoride varnishes and casein-based products pose importance in the preventive and therapeutic plan on treating mild molar incisor hypomineralisation (MIH). Fluoride varnishes provides resistance to dental caries and reduces dental hypersensitivity by encouraging remineralization of the affected enamel. A temporary protective layer is formed over the tooth, encouraging fluoride uptake and reducing enamel breakdown. Additionally, casein phosphopeptide–amorphous calcium phosphate (CPP-ACP) based products, derived from casein provides a high concentration of calcium and phosphate ions at the tooth surface, promoting remineralization and preventing demineralization of the enamel. A comprehensive strategy to stop the advancement of MIH and restore the structural integrity of the afflicted teeth is provided by the combined use of casein-based products and fluoride varnishes.

Severely hypomineralized molars should be referred to a multidisciplinary team of paediatrics and orthodontists. Affected molars can be treated with preformed metal crowns (PMC) or resin-modified GIC. PMC reduces sensitivity, preventing cusp fracture and maintaining occlusal vertical dimensions and crown heights. This is a conservative technique with minimal tooth structure removal. Additionally, PMC can function as a temporary restoration before the ideal age for tooth extraction in youth. In the case of indirect restorations such as onlays or crowns as management options, the bonding strength is affected by the amount of sound enamel available and should be carefully considered. To improve the bonding effectiveness of resin dental adhesives to hypomineralized enamel, it has been proposed to deproteinize the enamel with 5% NaOCl prior to an adhesive application technique. Gold/nickel, chromium/cobalt, or chromium are the preferred materials for onlays because they are conservative of tooth structure and require little preparation.

Biomimetic mineralization aims to emulate enamel biomineralisation, a well-coordinated process involving ameloblasts, matrix proteins, and hydroxyapatite crystallization. Researchers target to develop materials and methods that can direct the development of enamel-like structures on teeth afflicted by MIH by comprehending the molecular and structural complexities of enamel production. The creation of scaffoldings, bioactive materials, and signalling molecules that can promote enamel regeneration with increased strength and resistance to demineralization is part of this treatment. The goal of biomimetic mineralization is to use the body's natural capacity for regeneration to repair damaged teeth from within.

Resin infiltration is a micro-invasive treatment for MIH. The incipient caries lesion is stopped by resin infiltration treatment, which uses resin sealing of the microporosities to create diffusion pathways for acids and dissolved minerals. Furthermore, the enamel structure can be mechanically strengthened by the resin matrix. In addition, resin infiltration also provides promising aesthetic outcomes by providing a masking effect on hypomineralized teeth.

Enamel hypocalcification is a defect of tooth enamel in which normal amounts of enamel are produced but are hypomineralized. In this defect the enamel is softer than normal. Some areas in enamel are hypocalcified: enamel spindles, enamel tufts, and enamel lamellae.

Causal factors may occur locally, affecting only a single tooth, or they may act systemically, affecting all teeth in which enamel is being formed. Local trauma or abscess formation can adversely affect the ameloblasts overlying a developing crown, resulting in enamel hypocalcification or hypoplasia. Affected teeth may have areas of coronal discoloration, or they may have actual pits and irregularities. This is most commonly seen in permanent teeth in which the overlying deciduous tooth becomes abscessed or is physically forced into the enamel organ of the permanent tooth. The resulting hypoplastic or hypocalcified permanent tooth is sometimes known as Turner's tooth.
