= Glyceryl octyl ascorbic acid =

Names
- IUPAC name (2R)-2-[(1S)-1,2-dihydroxyethyl]-3-(2,3-dihydroxypropoxy)-4-octoxy-2H-furan-5-one
- Other names 3-O-glyceryl-2-O-octyl ascorbic acid; 3-O-(2,3-Dihydroxypropyl)-2-O-octyl-L-ascorbic acid

Identifiers
CAS Number	1120360-26-0
3D model (JSmol)	Interactive image
ChemSpider	129562742
PubChem CID	54588053
CompTox Dashboard (EPA)	DTXSID301336528
- InChI: InChI=1S/C17H30O8/c1-2-3-4-5-6-7-8-23-16-15(24-11-12(20)9-18)14(13(21)10-19)25-17(16)22/h12-14,18-21H,2-11H2,1H3/t12?,13-,14+/m0/s1 Key: BZNPYIWZPTYCQH-KFTPUPIBSA-N
- SMILES: CCCCCCCCOC1=C([C@H](OC1=O)[C@H](CO)O)OCC(CO)O

Properties
Chemical formula	C_{17}H_{30}O_{8}
Molar mass	362.419 g·mol^{−1}
- Except where otherwise noted, data are given for materials in their standard state (at 25 °C [77 °F], 100 kPa). Infobox references

Glyceryl octyl ascorbic acid (GO-VC) is an amphipathic derivative of vitamin C consisting of two ether linkages: a 1-octyl at position 2 and a glycerin at position 3. The chemical name is 2-glyceryl-3-octyl ascorbic acid. The isomer in which these two groups are swapped (2-octyl-3-glyceryl ascorbic acid, OG-VC) is also known.

It is considered as a new stable amphipathic vitamin C derivative in the field of aesthetic medicine.

== Overview ==
Vitamin C is rapidly converted to ascorbic acid radicals by UV rays, which causes cytotoxicity and sunburn, but GO-VC improves the stability of conventional vitamin C derivatives, and thus eliminates the problems of these prooxidants. Water-soluble vitamin C derivatives, such as sodium ascorbyl phosphate (APS), which have been used since the 1990s, have a problem of drying the skin in order to the sebum suppression effect. On the other hand, GO-VC has a high moisturizing power due to the binding of glycerin and can prevent the dryness of the skin. In addition, GO-VC has a sterilizing activity of octanol, so it has a sterilizing activity against many bacteria.

GO-VC is also used for wound healing and wrinkle prevention because it has a proliferative effect on fibroblasts and a promoting effect on type I collagen production. GO-VC has a stronger melanin production inhibitory effect than arbutin, which is used as a whitening agent, and it was confirmed in clinical trials that even low concentrations of 0.01 to 0.1% (by weight) are effective against acne redness and pigmentation.

The water-soluble vitamin C derivatives such as ascorbic acid 2-glucoside and APPS (trisodium ascorbyl palmitate) can not add to water-soluble polymer gels commonly used in cosmetics such as carboxy vinyl polymer and sodium polyacrylate. This is because the viscosity changes, causing precipitation. On the other hand, GO-VC can be dispersed in water-soluble polymer gel transparently and uniformly or can be stably dissolved for a long time.

The fat-soluble vitamin C derivatives such as ascorbyl tetrahexyl decanoate (VC-IP) are almost insoluble in water, making it difficult to mix in water-soluble formulations such as lotions without the use of surfactants. Fat-soluble vitamin C derivatives causes lipid oxidation problems when lipids are released, and the color of the formulation tends to change. GO-VC can solve these problems almost completely.

GO-VC is well absorbed percutaneously due to its amphiphilic nature, and because it is negatively charged rather than completely non-ionic, it can facilitate percutaneous absorption with an iontophoresis device. In addition, GO-VC is amphipathic but does not have a lipid group, so there are few skin toxicity problems due to lipid peroxidation, and it does not have the sticky feeling of conventional vitamin C derivatives and has a good feel.

== Stability ==
When the aqueous solution containing vitamin C and GO-VC was stored at 50 °C for 90 days, the vitamin C residual amount decreased to less than 30% in 30 days, whereas the residual amount of GO-VC was 90% or more. Moreover, after 90 days, 80% or more of GO-VC was confirmed to remain.

It is considered that these high stability are due to the two most reactive hydroxyl groups of vitamin C being capped by glycerin and octanol at the same time. Because the viscosity is stable in the preparation containing GO-VC and the polymer gel too, and it can be kept in a transparent state for a long period of time. Therefore, GO-VC can be added to many preparations such as lotions, creams, serums and gels.

== Acne ==
It was reported that GO-VC is effective against post-inflammatory hyperpigmentation (PIH), post-inflammatory erythema (PIE), and atrophic scar (AS), which are important complications in acne. It applied a complex vitamin C derivative lotion containing GO-VC to each of 10 patients with acne twice on the right side twice a day for 3 months, and confirmed the left side without application and its effect. It was reported that there was a marked improvement in PIH, PIE, and AS on the only right side applying lotion containing GO-VC after 3 months.

== Pigmentation ==
Many phenolic compounds, which are conventional whitening agents, react with tyrosinase to induce melanocyte-specific cytotoxicity, and thus there was a risk of developing vitiligo. GO-VC reduced the intracellular melanin content of B16 melanoma cells. GO-VC's pigmentation inhibitory mechanism is shown to act through a novel melanogenesis inhibitory system that does not depend on tyrosinase activity inhibition, indicating that it is a safe and effective pigmentation inhibitor with low risk of vitiligo. GO-VC showed a remarkable effect in an actual pigmentation suppression clinical study, and a gel preparation containing 0.1% GO-VC was applied twice a day in the morning and evening on the entire face after 13 female subjects aged 39.8 years on average. As a result of a 1-5 month study, GO-VC significantly improved post-inflammatory pigmentation. It is reported that GO-VC also showed a clear improvement in pigmentation caused by metal allergy, which was not very effective when applied with hydroquinone.

== Skin pore related diseases ==
Since conventional water-soluble vitamin C does not easily penetrate the skin barrier, an amphipathic vitamin C derivative was developed to improve this. However, since lipids such as palmitic acid were chemical modified to vitamin C derivatives in the past, exposure to ultraviolet light generated free fatty acids, raising concerns about lipid peroxidation. It was thought that GO-VC could avoid the problem of lipid peroxidation because GO-VC is amphipathic with octanol instead of lipid. The effect of 0.05% gel of GO-VC was investigated on skin pore related diseases. As a result, it was confirmed that there were no side effects and the number of abnormal pores decreased to 70% or less within 1 to 2 months after application.
