= 2-Octyl cyanoacrylate =

Names
- Preferred IUPAC name Octan-2-yl 2-cyanoprop-2-enoate
- Other names 2-Octyl 2-cyanoacrylate; 1-Methylheptyl cyanoacrylate

Identifiers
CAS Number	133978-15-1
3D model (JSmol)	Interactive image
Beilstein Reference	11343617
ChemSpider	7991439
DrugBank	DB12040
ECHA InfoCard	100.223.166
EC Number	700-845-1
PubChem CID	9815689
UNII	L23GHX71SK
CompTox Dashboard (EPA)	DTXSID30888954
- InChI: InChI=1S/C12H19NO2/c1-4-5-6-7-8-11(3)15-12(14)10(2)9-13/h11H,2,4-8H2,1,3H3 Key: CQVWXNBVRLKXPE-UHFFFAOYSA-N; InChI=1/C12H19NO2/c1-4-5-6-7-8-11(3)15-12(14)10(2)9-13/h11H,2,4-8H2,1,3H3 Key: CQVWXNBVRLKXPE-UHFFFAOYAO
- SMILES: C=C(C#N)C(OC(C)CCCCCC)=O

Properties
Chemical formula	C_{12}H_{19}NO_{2}
Molar mass	209.289 g·mol^{−1}
- Except where otherwise noted, data are given for materials in their standard state (at 25 °C [77 °F], 100 kPa). verify (what is ?) Infobox references

2-Octyl cyanoacrylate is a cyanoacrylate ester typically used as a wound closure adhesive (under the brand name Dermabond). It is closely related to octyl cyanoacrylate. The use of 2-octyl cyanoacrylate was approved in 1998; offered as an alternative to stitches, sutures, and or adhesive strips.

== Adhesion mechanism ==
When the 2-octyl cyanoacrylate monomers are exposed to anions, provided either by moisture from the skin or exudate they quickly polymerize causing an exothermic reaction binding to the most superficial layer of epithelium. The seal formed by the cyanoacrylate is water tight allowing for the wound to heal uninterrupted.

=== Anti-microbial properties ===
Anti-microbial properties have been observed against gram-positive and non-pseudomonas gram-negative bacteria, but are not fully understood. It is believed that the interaction between the positively charged bacterial capsule and the negatively charged 8-octyl cyanoacrylate destabilizes the cell capsule of the bacteria, killing it.

== See also ==
- Methyl cyanoacrylate
- Ethyl cyanoacrylate
- Butyl cyanoacrylate
- Octyl cyanoacrylate
