= Harry Coover =

American inventor of Super Glue

Harry Wesley Coover Jr
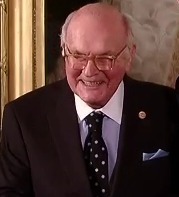
- Coover shortly before being awarded the National Medal of Technology and Innovation by Barack Obama in 2010
- Born: March 6, 1917; Newark, Delaware, U.S.
- Died: March 26, 2011 (aged 94); Kingsport, Tennessee, U.S.
- Education: Hobart and William Smith Colleges (BS) Cornell University (MS, PhD)
- Occupation: Inventor
- Known for: Super Glue

Harry Wesley Coover Jr. (March 6, 1917 – March 26, 2011) was an American chemist and the inventor of Eastman 910, commonly known as Super Glue.

== Life and career ==
Coover was born in Newark, Delaware. He lived in Delaware until his teen years. During this time, he was hit by a train while driving which resulted in him being in a coma for about six weeks. After he recovered, Coover moved to Weedsport, New York to finish high school. He stayed in New York and received his Bachelor of Science from Hobart College in chemistry before earning his Master of Science and PhD in organic chemistry from Cornell University. His dissertation was on commercial synthesis of vitamin B6. He intended to work with vitamin B6 until WWII hit and the process he developed was taken by the military for their use. Coover worked as a chemist for Eastman Kodak from 1944–1973 and as the Vice President of research and development for the company from 1973-1984. In 1951, Coover had moved to Eastman Kodak's chemical plant in Kingsport Tennessee.

Coover was married to Muriel Zumbach Coover for over 60 years until her death in 2005. He is survived by his sons Harry Wesley Coover III, Dr. Stephen Rohm Coover, daughter Dr. Melinda Rohm Coover Paul, four grandchildren Brett Evan Coover, Dr. Dana Noelle Coover DVM, Vincent Adam Paul, and Kirsten Rohm Paul Gilliam and 4 great-grandchildren.

Coover died of natural causes at his home in Kingsport, Tennessee, on March 26, 2011.

== Super Glue ==
In 1942, while searching for materials to make more secure cockpit covers for military planes, cyanoacrylate was discovered. At this time they were deemed too sticky to be of use and were set aside. In 1951, Coover and his team at Eastman Kodak examined cyanoacrylates again. Coover was overseeing Kodak chemists investigating heat-resistant polymers for jet canopies when cyanoacrylates were once again tested and proved too sticky. When a chemist in the group informed Coover that he had permanently damaged an expensive refractometer by gluing it together, Coover recognized that he had discovered a unique adhesive. In 1958, the adhesive, marketed by Kodak as Eastman 910 and then as Super Glue, was introduced for sale.

Generally, cyanoacrylate is an acrylic resin which rapidly polymerises in the presence of water (specifically hydroxide ions), forming long, strong chains, joining the bonded surfaces together. Because the presence of moisture causes the glue to set, exposure to moisture in the air can cause a tube or bottle of glue to become unusable over time. To prevent an opened container of glue from setting before use, it must be stored in an airtight jar or bottle with a package of silica gel. Another convenient way is attaching a hypodermic needle on the opening of glue. After applying, residual glue soon clogs the needle, keeping moisture out. The clog is removed by heating the needle (e.g. by a lighter) before use.

Cyanoacrylate is used as a forensic tool to capture latent fingerprints on non-porous surfaces like glass, plastic, etc. Cyanoacrylate is warmed to produce fumes which react with the invisible fingerprint residues and atmospheric moisture to form a white polymer (polycyanoacrylate) on the fingerprint ridges. The ridges can then be recorded. The developed fingerprints are, on most surfaces (except on white plastic or similar), visible to the naked eye. Invisible or poorly visible prints can be further enhanced by applying a luminescent or non-luminescent stain.

Chemical structure of methyl cyanoacrylate, the basis of Superglue

While much attention was given to the glue's capacity to bond solid materials, Coover was also the first to recognize and patent cyanoacrylates as a tissue adhesive after his eldest son cut open his finger while making a model and glued the cut closed with the glue he had samples of from the lab, an early formulation of super glue. Super glue was first used in the Vietnam War in a spray form as a hemostatic agent to temporarily patch the internal organs of injured soldiers until conventional surgery could be performed. Tissue adhesives are now used worldwide for a variety of sutureless surgical applications in humans and animals.

Coover said many times that he was most proud of the medical applications of cyanoacrylates, that they had saved many lives and would continue to do so.

== Other inventions ==
Coover held 460 patents and Super Glue was just one of his many discoveries. He viewed "programmed innovation," a management methodology emphasizing research and development, among his most important work. Coover later formed an international management consulting practice, advising corporate clients around the world on programmed innovation methodology.

Coover received the Southern Chemist Man of the Year Award for his outstanding accomplishments in individual innovation and creativity. He also held the Earle B. Barnes Award for Leadership in Chemical Research Management, the Maurice Holland Award, the IRI Achievement Award, and was a medalist for the Industrial Research Institute. In 1983, Coover was elected to the National Academy of Engineering. In 2004, Coover was inducted into the National Inventor's Hall of Fame. In 2010, Coover received the National Medal of Technology and Innovation.
