= Lamina limitans =

Dental anatomy

In dental anatomy, the lamina limitans is the innermost surface of the dentinal tubule (that exist in dentin) that lies in intimate contact with the long process of the odontoblast. It is hypocalcified and appears electron-dense in electron microscopy. It is composed of a fibrous outer layer and a membranous inner layer. It was previously known as the sheath of Neumann.
