= Cyanoacetic acid =

Names
- Preferred IUPAC name 2-Cyanoacetic acid

Identifiers
CAS Number	372-09-8
3D model (JSmol)	Interactive image
Beilstein Reference	506325
ChEBI	CHEBI:51889
ChemSpider	9357
ECHA InfoCard	100.006.131
EC Number	206-743-9
PubChem CID	9740
UNII	QZT550H2Y9
UN number	1759
CompTox Dashboard (EPA)	DTXSID0027149
- InChI: InChI=1S/C3H3NO2/c4-2-1-3(5)6/h1H2,(H,5,6) Key: MLIREBYILWEBDM-UHFFFAOYSA-N; InChI=1/C3H3NO2/c4-2-1-3(5)6/h1H2,(H,5,6) Key: MLIREBYILWEBDM-UHFFFAOYAD
- SMILES: C(C#N)C(=O)O

Properties
Chemical formula	C_{3}H_{3}NO_{2}
Molar mass	85.06 g/mol
Appearance	colorless solid
Density	1.287 g/cm^{3}
Melting point	69–70 °C (156–158 °F; 342–343 K)
Boiling point	108 °C (15 mm Hg)
Solubility in water	1000 g/L (20 °C) in water

Hazards
- GHS labelling
Pictograms	(GHS05: Corrosive) (GHS07: Exclamation mark)
Signal word	Danger
Hazard statements	H302, H314, H332
Precautionary statements	P260, P264, P270, P271, P280, P301+P312, P301+P330+P331, P303+P361+P353, P304+P312, P304+P340, P305+P351+P338, P310, P312, P321, P330, P363, P405, P501
Flash point	107 °C (225 °F; 380 K)

Related compounds
Related	Ethyl cyanoacetate Cyanoacetamide
- Except where otherwise noted, data are given for materials in their standard state (at 25 °C [77 °F], 100 kPa). Infobox references

Cyanoacetic acid is an organic compound. It is a white, hygroscopic solid. The compound contains two functional groups, a nitrile (−C≡N) and a carboxylic acid. It is a precursor to cyanoacrylates, components of adhesives.

== Preparation and reactions ==
Cyanoacetic acid is prepared by treatment of chloroacetate salts with sodium cyanide followed by acidification. Electrosynthesis by cathodic reduction of carbon dioxide and anodic oxidation of acetonitrile also affords cyanoacetic acid.

Cyanoacetic acid is used to do cyanoacetylation, first convenient method described by J. Slätt.

It is about 1000× more acidic than acetic acid, with a pK_{a} of 2.5.

Upon heating at 160 °C, it undergoes decarboxylation to give acetonitrile:

HO_{2}CCH_{2}CN → CO_{2} + CH_{3}CN

== Applications ==
In its largest scale application, cyanoacetic acid is first esterified to give ethyl cyanoacetate. Condensation of that ester with formaldehyde gives ethyl cyanoacrylate, which used as superglue. As of 2007, more than 10,000 tons of cyanoacetic acid were produced annually.

Cyanoacetic acid is a versatile intermediate in the preparation of other chemicals. it is a precursor to synthetic caffeine via the intermediacy of theophylline. It is a building block for many drugs, including dextromethorphan, amiloride, sulfadimethoxine, and allopurinol.

== Safety ==
The LD_{50} (oral, rats) is 1.5 g/kg.
