= 2-Octanol =

- Skeletal formula

Names
- Preferred IUPAC name Octan-2-ol
- Other names 2-Octanol; 2-Octyl alcohol 1-Methyl-1-heptanol sec-Capryl alcohol Methylhexylcarbinol sec-Caprylic alcohol

Identifiers
CAS Number	123-96-6
3D model (JSmol)	Interactive image
Beilstein Reference	1719322
ChEBI	CHEBI:37869
ChEMBL	ChEMBL510068
ChemSpider	18920
ECHA InfoCard	100.004.244
EC Number	204-667-0
Gmelin Reference	131016
PubChem CID	20083
RTECS number	RH0795000
UNII	66B0DD5E40
CompTox Dashboard (EPA)	DTXSID0027014
- InChI: InChI=1S/C20H30N7O16P3/c21-9-2-1-3-26(4-9)19-15(30)13(28)10(40-19)5-38-45(34,35)43-46(36,37)39-6-11-14(29)16(42-44(31,32)33)20(41-11)27-8-25-12-17(22)23-7-24-18(12)27/h1,3-4,7-8,10-11,13-16,19-20,28-30H,2,5-6,21H2,(H,34,35)(H,36,37)(H2,22,23,24)(H2,31,32,33) Key: IMPUPYZMUDSKSF-UHFFFAOYSA-N; InChI=1/C20H30N7O16P3/c21-9-2-1-3-26(4-9)19-15(30)13(28)10(40-19)5-38-45(34,35)43-46(36,37)39-6-11-14(29)16(42-44(31,32)33)20(41-11)27-8-25-12-17(22)23-7-24-18(12)27/h1,3-4,7-8,10-11,13-16,19-20,28-30H,2,5-6,21H2,(H,34,35)(H,36,37)(H2,22,23,24)(H2,31,32,33) Key: IMPUPYZMUDSKSF-UHFFFAOYAA
- SMILES: CC(O)CCCCCC

Properties
Chemical formula	C_{8}H_{18}O
Molar mass	130.231 g·mol^{−1}
Appearance	Colourless liquid with characteristic odour
Density	0.820 7 (g/cm^{3}) (20°C)
Melting point	−38 °C (−36 °F; 235 K)
Boiling point	178.5 °C (353.3 °F; 451.6 K)
Solubility in water	1.120 g/L
log P	2.9
Vapor pressure	0.031 mbar (20 °C); 0.11 mbar (30 °C); 0.9 mbar (50 °C)
Henry's law constant (k_{H})	1.23·10^{−4} atm-m^{3}/mol
Refractive index (n_{D})	1.426 (20 °C)
Viscosity	6.2 cP

Thermochemistry
Heat capacity (C)	330.1 (J/mol*K) (298.5K)

Hazards
- Occupational safety and health (OHS/OSH)
Eye hazards	2
Skin hazards	2
- GHS labelling
Pictograms	(GHS02: Flammable) (GHS07: Exclamation mark) (GHS09: Environmental hazard)
Signal word	Warning
Hazard statements	H226, H315, H319, H411, H412
Precautionary statements	P210, P233, P240, P241, P242, P243, P273, P280, P303+P361+P353, P305+P351+P338, P370+P378, P391, P403+P235, P501
NFPA 704 (fire diamond)	1 2 0
Flash point	71 °C (160 °F; 344 K)
Autoignition temperature	265 °C (509 °F; 538 K)
Explosive limits	0.8 % v/v (lower); 7.4 % v/v (upper)
- Lethal dose or concentration (LD, LC)
LD_{50} (median dose)	>3.2 g/kg (rat, oral); 4 g/kg (mouse, oral)
Safety data sheet (SDS)	Flinn Scientific
- Except where otherwise noted, data are given for materials in their standard state (at 25 °C [77 °F], 100 kPa). Infobox references

2-Octanol (octan-2-ol, 2-OH) is an organic compound with the chemical formula CH_{3}CH(OH)(CH_{2})_{5}CH_{3}. It is a colorless oily liquid that is poorly soluble in water but soluble in most organic solvents. 2-Octanol is classified fatty alcohol. A secondary alcohol, it is chiral.

== Production ==
2-Octanol is produced commercially by base-cleavage of ricinoleic acid. The coproduct is a mixture of sebacic acid ((C_{8}H_{16}CO_{2}H)_{2}). Castor oil, which consists mainly of triglycerides of ricinoleic acid, is the main feedstock.

== Uses ==
It is a precursor to 2-octyl cyanoacrylate, a version of superglue used as a wound closure adhesive. It is closely related to octyl cyanoacrylate. The use of 2-octyl cyanoacrylate was approved in 1998; offered as an alternative to stitches, sutures, and or adhesive strips.

2-Octanol is also used as:

- Flavor
- low-volatility solvent : Diverses Resins (Paints & Coatings, Adhesives, Inks, etc.), Agrochemicals, Mineral Extraction, etc....
- Defoaming agent : Pulp & Paper, Oil & Gas, Cement, Coatings, Coal, etc.
- a frother in mineral flotation
- wetting agent

It can also be used as a chemical intermediate for production of various other chemicals:

- Surfactants (ethoxylates, sulfates, ether sulfates, etc.),
- Cosmetic emollients esters (palmitate, adipate, maleate, stearate, myristate, etc.),
- Plasticizers (acrylates, maleates, etc.),
- Pesticides: Dinocap
- Lubricants: Zinc dithiophosphate (ZDDP)
- Fragrances (salicylate)
- Used in the manufacturing of perfumes and disinfectant soaps
- Used to prevent foaming and as a solvent for fats and waxes
- Used to examine and control Essential Tremor and other types of involuntary neurological tremors

== See also ==
- 1-Octanol
