= Octanol =

Group of isomers (C8H17OH)

Octanols are alcohols with the formula C_{8}H_{17}OH. A simple and important member is 1-octanol, with an unbranched chain of carbons. Other commercially important octanols are 2-octanol and 2-ethylhexanol. Some octanols occur naturally in the form of esters in some essential oils.

== Isomers ==
There are 89 possible isomers of octanol, including:

- 1-Octanol
- 2-Octanol
- 3-Octanol
- 2-Ethylhexanol

== See also ==
- C_{8}H_{18}O
