= Dermal adhesive =

Glue used to close wounds in the skin

A dermal adhesive (or skin glue) is a glue used to close wounds in the skin as an alternative to sutures, staples, or clips.

Glued closure results in less scarring and is less prone to infection than sutured or stapled closure. There is also no residual closure to remove, so follow-up visits for removal are not required.

Some research is ongoing on making biodegradable glue for use inside the body, which can thus be broken down safely by the body.

== Products ==
Product	Manufacturer
derma+flex	Medical Products, Inc.
Dermabond	Ethicon, Johnson & Johnson
GluStitch	GluStitch Inc.
HistoAcryl	B. Braun Melsungen AG
HistoAcryl Flex	B. Braun Melsungen AG
Indermil	Loctite Corp.
LiquiBand	MedlogicGlobal

== See also ==
- Liquid bandage
- Cyanoacrylate § Medical and veterinary
- Bone cement
