= Octyl cyanoacrylate =

- Skeletal formula

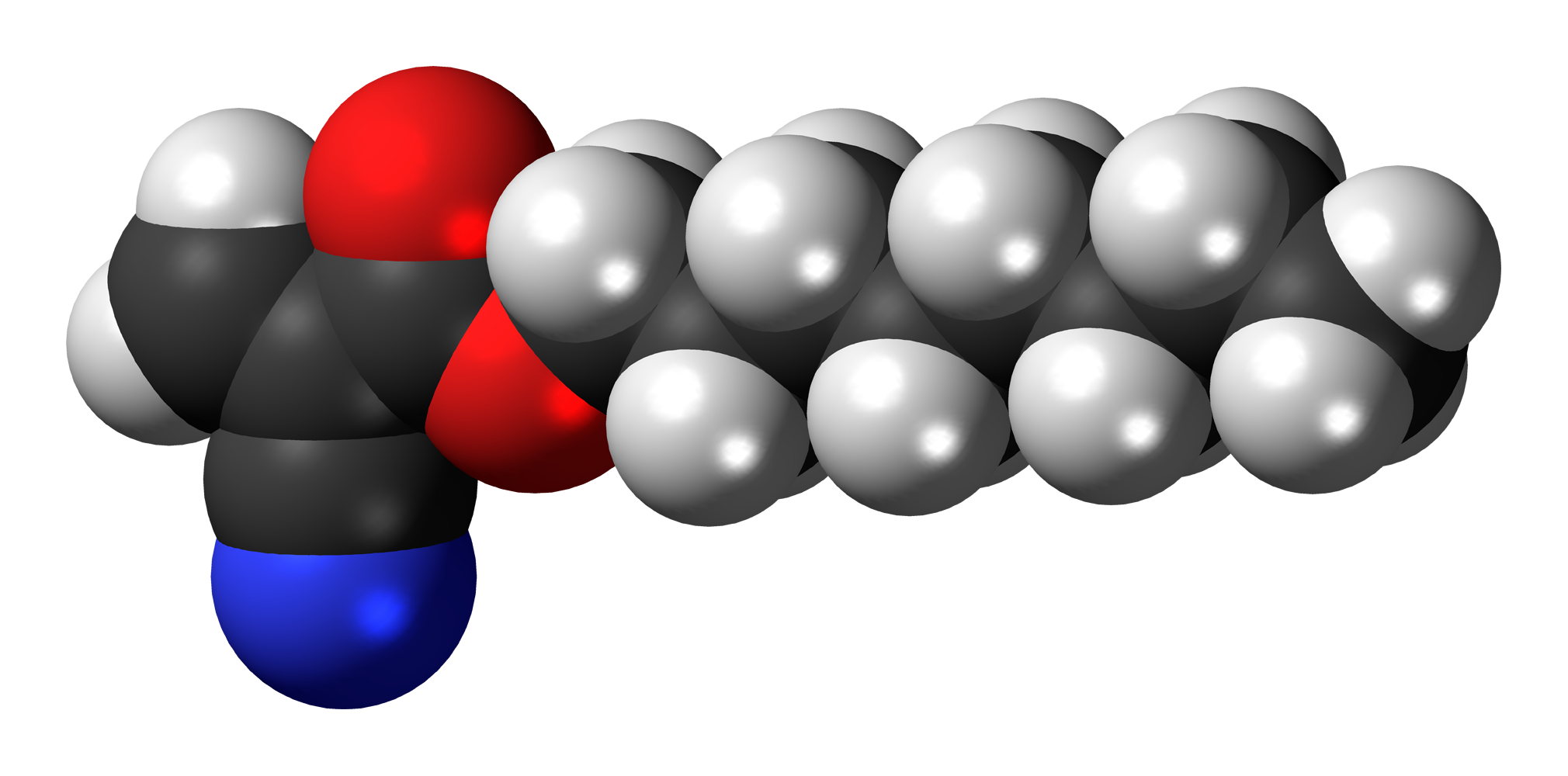

Names
- Preferred IUPAC name Octyl 2-cyanoprop-2-enoate
- Other names Octyl 2-cyanopropenoate Octyl 2-cyanoacrylate Ocrylate

Identifiers
CAS Number	6701-17-3
3D model (JSmol)	Interactive image
ChemSpider	21678
ECHA InfoCard	100.027.045
PubChem CID	23167
UNII	6C655P1XVG
CompTox Dashboard (EPA)	DTXSID10217208
- InChI: InChI=1S/C12H19NO2/c1-3-4-5-6-7-8-9-15-12(14)11(2)10-13/h2-9H2,1H3 Key: RPQUGMLCZLGZTG-UHFFFAOYSA-N; InChI=1/C12H19NO2/c1-3-4-5-6-7-8-9-15-12(14)11(2)10-13/h2-9H2,1H3 Key: RPQUGMLCZLGZTG-UHFFFAOYAE
- SMILES: N#CC(C(OCCCCCCCC)=O)=C

Properties
Chemical formula	C_{12}H_{19}NO_{2}
Molar mass	209.289 g·mol^{−1}
Appearance	Colorless liquid
Density	1.0±0.1 g/cm3
Boiling point	297.6±23.0 °C
Solubility in water	Reacts

Hazards
Flash point	137.2±9.4 °C
- Except where otherwise noted, data are given for materials in their standard state (at 25 °C [77 °F], 100 kPa). verify (what is ?) Infobox references

Octyl cyanoacrylate (OCA), a cyanoacrylate ester, is an octyl ester of 2-cyano-2-propenoic acid. It is a clear colorless liquid with a sharp, irritating odor. Its chief use is as the main component of medical cyanoacrylate glues.

In medical and veterinary applications, OCA, n-butyl cyanoacrylate (n-BCA) and isobutyl cyanoacrylate (ICA) are commonly used. They provide rapid wound closure, are bacteriostatic, and their use is usually painless. Butyl esters provide a stronger bond, but the glue is rigid. The octyl ester, while providing weaker bond, is more flexible. Blends of OCA and n-BCA are available which offer both flexibility and a strong bond.

It polymerizes rapidly in presence of moisture.

Heating to higher temperatures causes pyrolysis and depolymerization of the cured glue, producing gaseous products strongly irritating to the lungs and eyes.

== See also ==
- Methyl cyanoacrylate
- Ethyl cyanoacrylate
- Butyl cyanoacrylate
- 2-Octyl cyanoacrylate
