= Liquid bandage =

Polymer skin treatment for minor cuts

Liquid bandage is a topical skin treatment for minor wounds which binds to the skin to form a protective polymeric layer that keeps dirt and germs out and moisture in. It can be directly applied to the wound after removing debris.

For the fast-acting, reactive adhesive that is used to mend deep cuts or surgery wounds, see cyanoacrylates (specifically 2-Octyl cyanoacrylate).

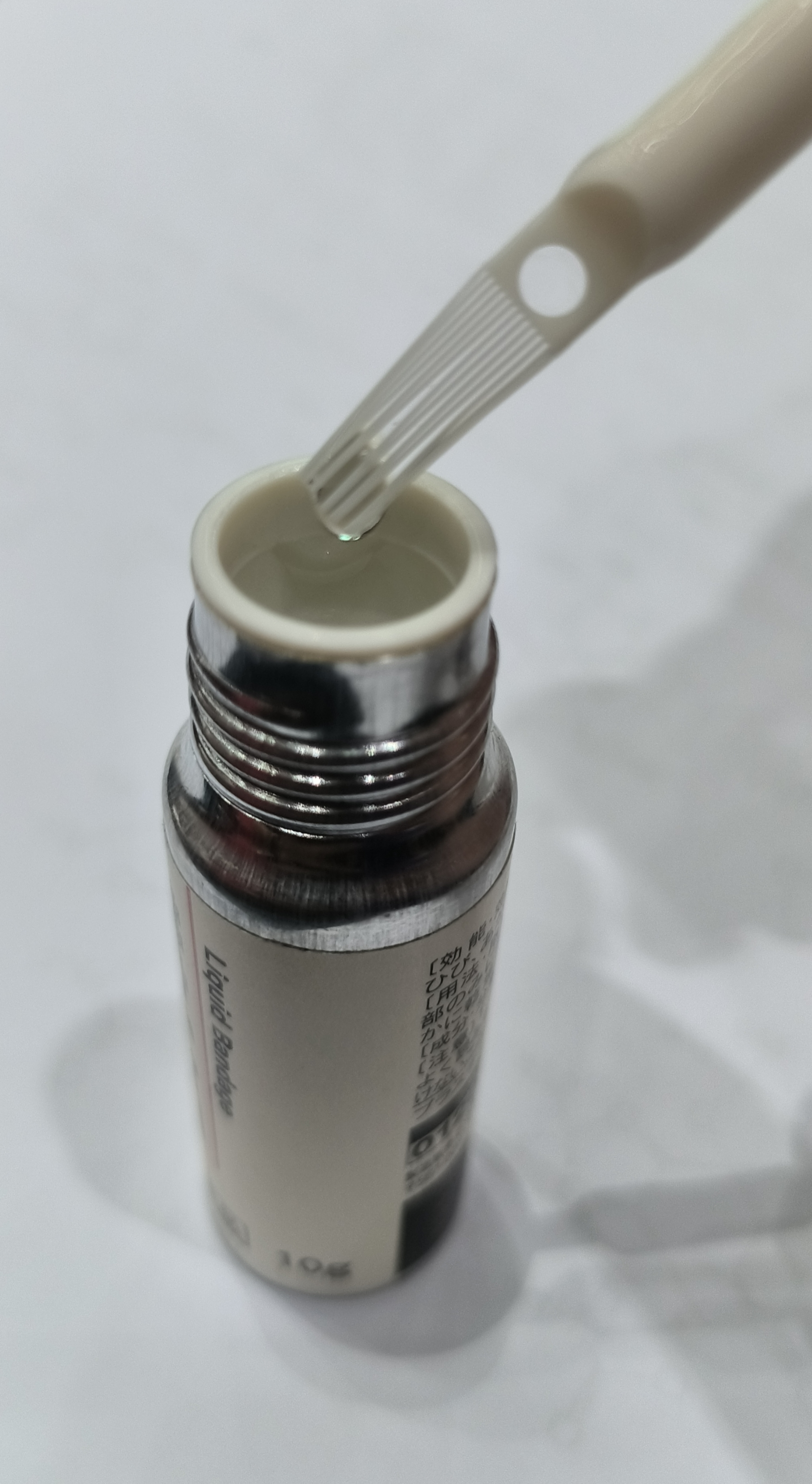

== Design ==
Liquid bandage is typically polymer dissolved in a solvent (commonly water or an alcohol), sometimes with an added antiseptic and local anesthetic, although the alcohol in some brands may serve the same purpose. These products protect the wound by forming a thin film of polymer when the carrier evaporates. Polymers used may include polyvinylpyrrolidone (water based), ethyl cellulose, pyroxylin/nitrocellulose or poly(methylacrylate-isobutene-monoisopropylmaleate) (alcohol based), and acrylate or siloxane polymers (hexamethyldisiloxane or isooctane solvent based).

In addition to their use in replacing conventional bandages in minor cuts and scrapes, they have found use in surgical and veterinary offices. Liquid bandages are increasingly finding use in the field of combat, where they can be used to rapidly stanch a wound until proper medical attention can be obtained.

== Scenarios for usage ==
Liquid bandages are suitable for clean cuts that close easily and shallow small wounds, as they will help both sides of the wound to bond and produce a suture-like effect. Due to the drying of liquid wound dressing, it will form a nonelastic film on the wound and cannot absorb tissue fluid.

If the wound area is too large, a liquid bandage will actually hinder wound shrinkage and healing. They are not recommended for use on large wounds, abrasion patches, ulcers, suppuration, burns, sensitive skin areas around the eyes, mucosa, and patients with favism.

== See also ==
- Butterfly stitches
- Dermal adhesive
