= 4-Deoxypyridoxine =

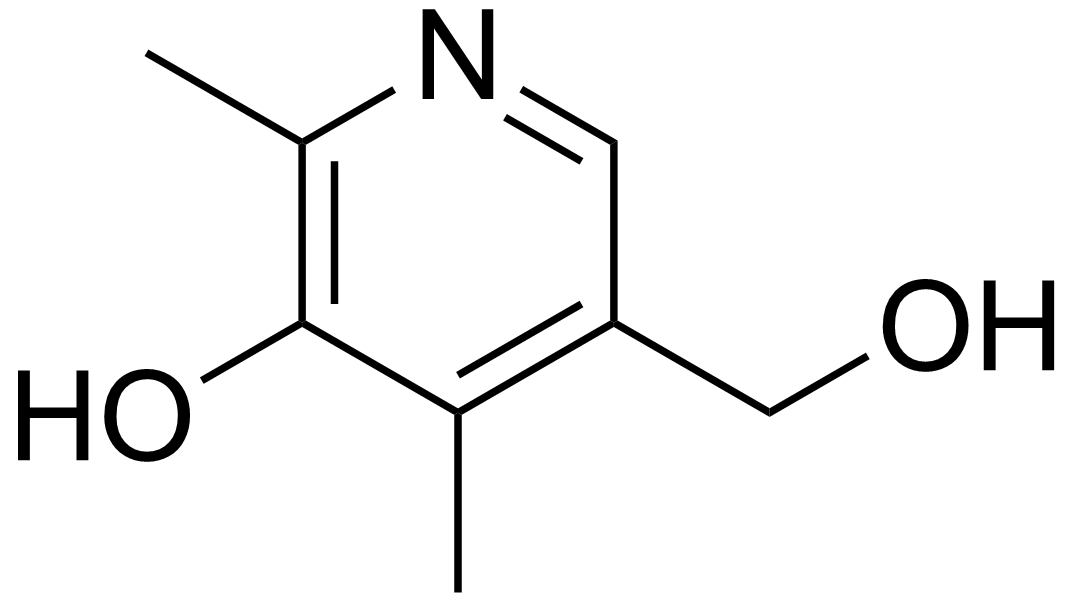
- 4-Deoxypyridoxine

Names
- Preferred IUPAC name 5-(Hydroxymethyl)-2,4-dimethylpyridin-3-ol

Identifiers
CAS Number	148-51-6
3D model (JSmol)	Interactive image; Interactive image
ChemSpider	5869
PubChem CID	6094
UNII	P9QAN95HHX
CompTox Dashboard (EPA)	DTXSID50209849
- InChI: InChI=1S/C8H11NO2/c1-5-7(4-10)3-9-6(2)8(5)11/h3,10-11H,4H2,1-2H3 Key: KKOWAYISKWGDBG-UHFFFAOYSA-N; InChI=1/C8H11NO2/c1-5-7(4-10)3-9-6(2)8(5)11/h3,10-11H,4H2,1-2H3 Key: KKOWAYISKWGDBG-UHFFFAOYAH
- SMILES: CC1=C(C(=NC=C1CO)C)O; Oc1c(c(cnc1C)CO)C

Properties
Chemical formula	C_{8}H_{11}NO_{2}
Molar mass	153.181 g·mol^{−1}
- Except where otherwise noted, data are given for materials in their standard state (at 25 °C [77 °F], 100 kPa). verify (what is ?) Infobox references

4-Deoxypyridoxine is a vitamin B_{6} antagonist. It may be toxic to developing embryos since it can have negative effects on collagen and elastin during development. The presence of this compound can produce vitamin B_{6} deficiency, which suppresses the immune system. 4-Deoxypyridoxine lowers vitamin B_{6} concentration by competitively inhibiting some of the enzymes necessary for the regeneration of vitamin B_{6.} The related immunosuppression can be beneficial in animal models of Trichinella spiralis infections. 4-Deoxypyridoxine has also been described as an inhibitor of sphingosine-1-phosphate lyase. The inhibition of sphingosine-1-phosphate lyase by 4-deoxypyridoxine has been shown to prevent cell death of ex vivo animal pancreatic islets. The use of 4-deoxypyridoxine to prevent stress-induced apoptosis is suggest that the compound, as well as other inhibitors of sphingosine-1-phosphate lyase, could be used to increase the viability of donor pancreatic tissue in the treatment of diabetes.
