= Enamel lamellae =

Type of structure in teeth

Enamel lamellae are a type of hypomineralized structure in teeth that extend either from the dentinoenamel junction (DEJ) to the surface of the enamel, or vice versa. In essence, they are prominent linear enamel defects, but are of no clinical consequence. These structures contain proteins, proteoglycans, and lipids.

Enamel lamellae should not be confused with two similar entities, enamel tufts and enamel spindles. Enamel tufts are small branching defects that are found only at the DEJ, and so differ from lamellae which can be facing either direction and are strictly linear. Enamel spindles are also linear defects, but they too can be found only at the DEJ, because they are formed by entrapment of odontoblast processes between ameloblasts prior to and during amelogenesis.

They may be classified as Type A, Type B and Type C, based on its extension, cause of formation and contents. Based on time of development, they may be classified as pre-and post-eruptive enamel lamellae.
