= Enamel spindles =

Defects of teeth

Enamel spindles are "short, linear defects, found at the dentinoenamel junction (DEJ) and extend into the enamel, often being more prevalent at the cusp tips." The DEJ is the interface of the enamel and the underlying dentin. Because they are "formed by entrapment of odontoblast processes between ameloblasts prior to and during amelogenesis," they cannot be found at the enamel surface protruding inward, as enamel lamellae are often located.

Enamel spindles are often confused with two other entities: enamel lamellae and enamel tufts. Lamellae are linear enamel defects that extend from the surface of the enamel towards the DEJ, or vice versa. Enamel tufts are "small, branching defects that are found only at the DEJ, protruding into the enamel towards the enamel surface. Enamel spindles however, are in fact odontoblast processes that extend into the enamel.
