= Ethyl cyanoacrylate =

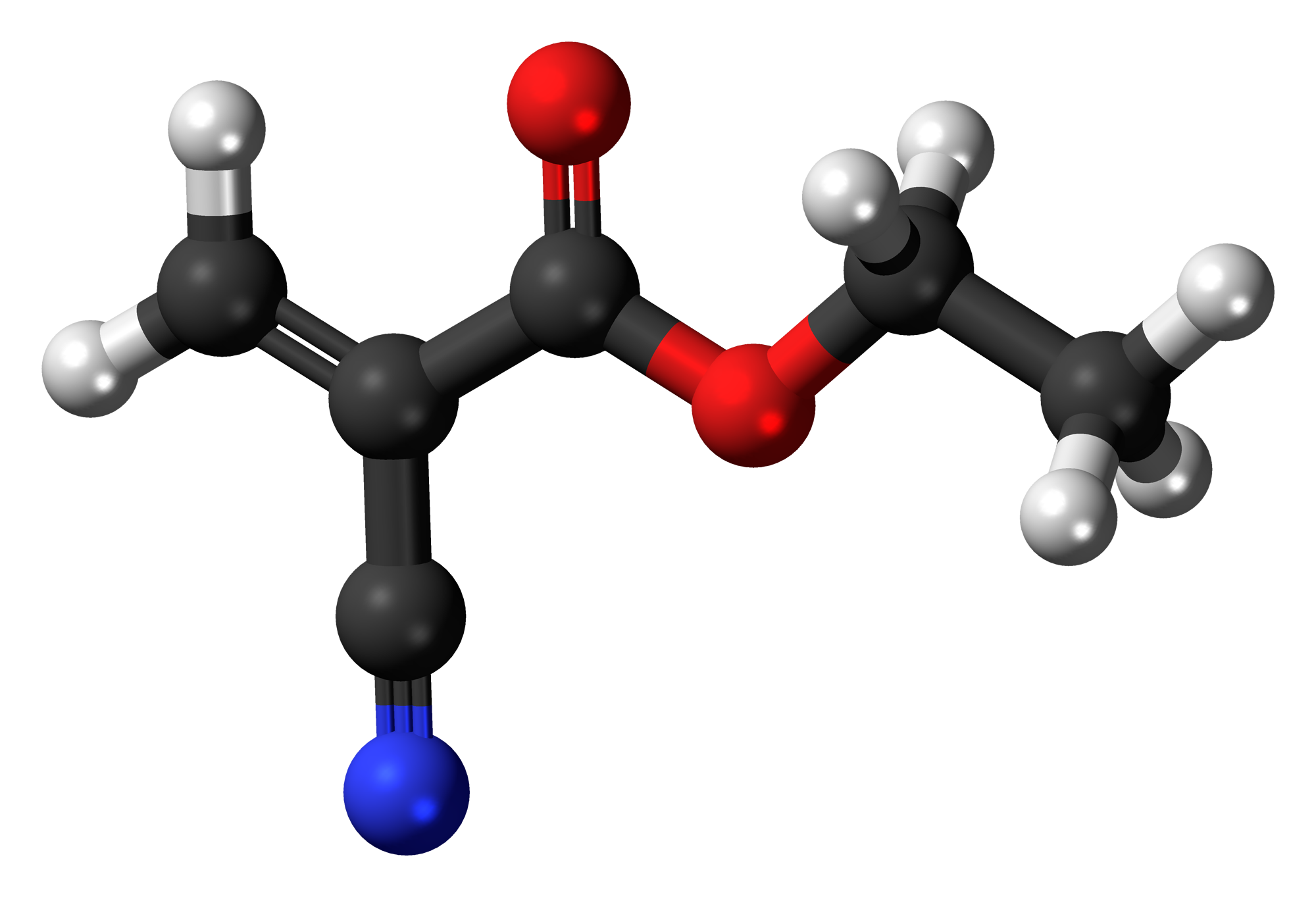

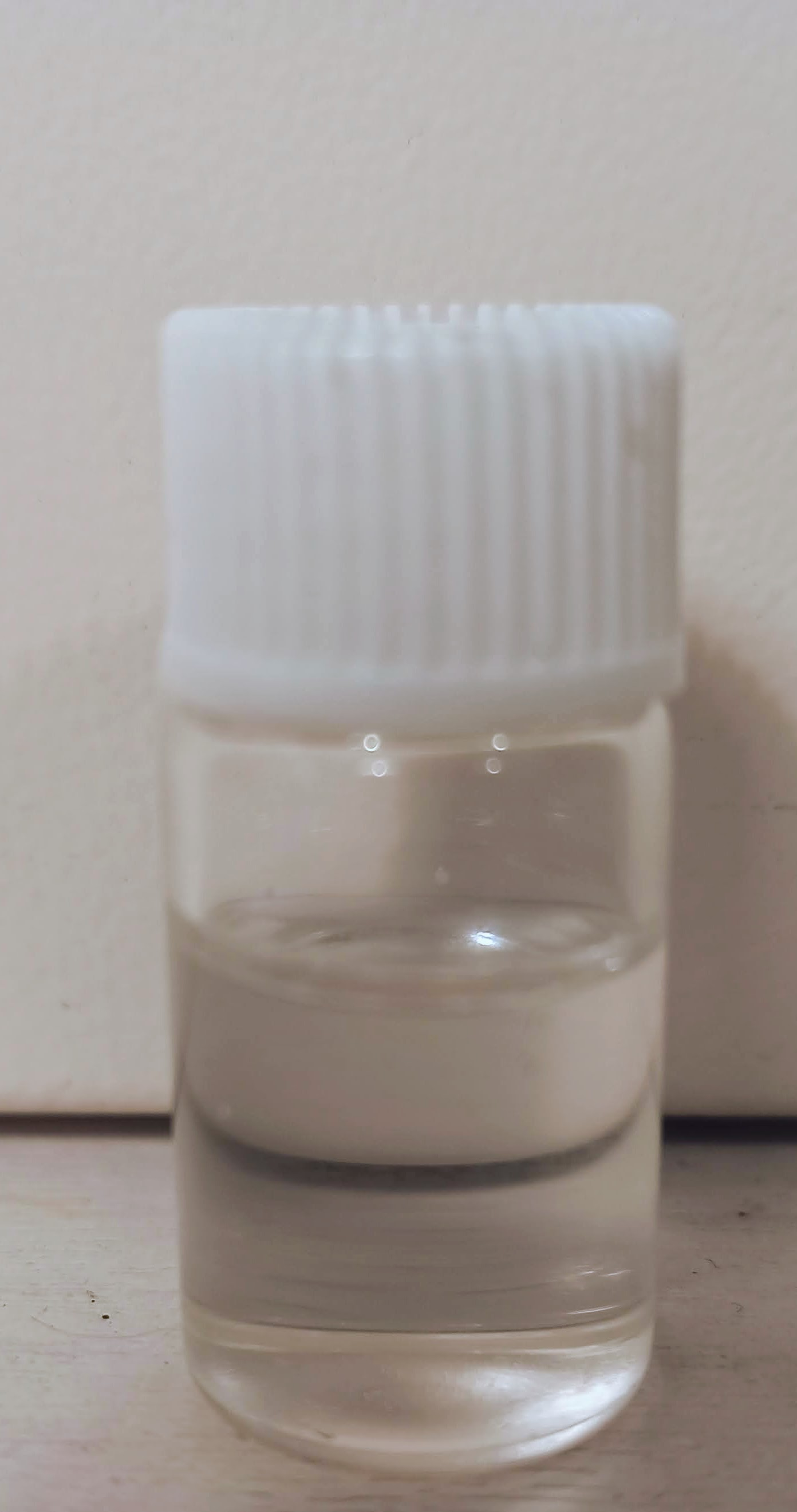

Names
- Preferred IUPAC name Ethyl 2-cyanoprop-2-enoate
- Other names Ethyl 2-cyanoacrylate; ECA; Ethyl alpha-cyanoacrylate; 910EM; ace-ee; CN2; CN4; Cemedine 3000rs; Krazy glue; KH502; Permabond 105 : Permabond 200; Super glue; Pro grip 4000; TK 200; TK 201; Cyanolite 201; Cyanacrine; Cyano-Veneer; Loctite 460

Identifiers
CAS Number	7085-85-0
3D model (JSmol)	Interactive image
ChEMBL	ChEMBL1564920
ChemSpider	73564
ECHA InfoCard	100.027.628
EC Number	230-391-5
PubChem CID	81530
RTECS number	UD3330050
UNII	2G95FOH7SF
UN number	1993
CompTox Dashboard (EPA)	DTXSID1025279
- InChI: InChI=1S/C6H7NO2/c1-3-9-6(8)5(2)4-7/h2-3H2,1H3 Key: FGBJXOREULPLGL-UHFFFAOYSA-N; InChI=1/C6H7NO2/c1-3-9-6(8)5(2)4-7/h2-3H2,1H3 Key: FGBJXOREULPLGL-UHFFFAOYAG
- SMILES: N#CC(=C)C(=O)OCC

Properties
Chemical formula	C_{6}H_{7}NO_{2}
Molar mass	125.127 g·mol^{−1}
Density	1.06 g/mL
Melting point	−22 °C (−8 °F; 251 K)
Boiling point	54 to 56 °C (129 to 133 °F; 327 to 329 K) at 3 mmHg
Solubility in water	Polymerises

Hazards
- GHS labelling
Pictograms	(GHS07: Exclamation mark)
Signal word	Warning
Hazard statements	H315, H319, H335
Precautionary statements	P261, P305+P351+P338
Flash point	83 °C (181 °F; 356 K)
Threshold limit value (TLV)	0.2 ppm
- Except where otherwise noted, data are given for materials in their standard state (at 25 °C [77 °F], 100 kPa). verify (what is ?) Infobox references

Ethyl cyanoacrylate (ECA), a cyanoacrylate ester, is an ethyl ester of 2-cyano-acrylic acid. It is a colorless liquid with low viscosity and a faint sweet smell in pure form. It is the main component of cyanoacrylate glues and can be encountered under many trade names, including superglue. It is soluble in acetone, methyl ethyl ketone, nitromethane, and methylene chloride. ECA polymerizes rapidly in presence of moisture.

== Production ==
Ethyl cyanoacrylate is prepared by the condensation of formaldehyde with ethyl cyanoacetate:

NCCH_{2}CO_{2}C_{2}H_{5} + CH_{2}O → H_{2}C=C(CN)CO_{2}C_{2}H_{5} + H_{2}O

This exothermic reaction affords the polymer, which is subsequently thermally cracked to give the monomer. Alternatively, it can be prepared by the ethoxycarbonylation of cyanoacetylene.

== Applications ==
Ethyl cyanoacrylate is used for gluing.

In forensics, cyanoacrylate ester has excellent non-destructive impressioning abilities, which are especially important when lifting fingerprints from delicate evidence items, or when the prints could not be lifted using traditional means such as fingerprinting powder. The procedure involves heating the acrylate in a sealed chamber. Its fumes then react with deposited proteins that form into a white, stable, and clear print outlines. The resulting prints could be used 'as is' or enhanced further by staining them with darker pigments. Liquid bandage systems use the less toxic n-butyl and octyl cyanoacrylates.

== Safety ==
In the U.S., the threshold limit value for ECA is 0.2 ppm. It is a strong irritant to the lungs and eyes.

== See also ==
- Cyanoacrylate
- Methyl cyanoacrylate
- Butyl cyanoacrylate
- Octyl cyanoacrylate
