= Enamel tufts =

Tooth enamel defects

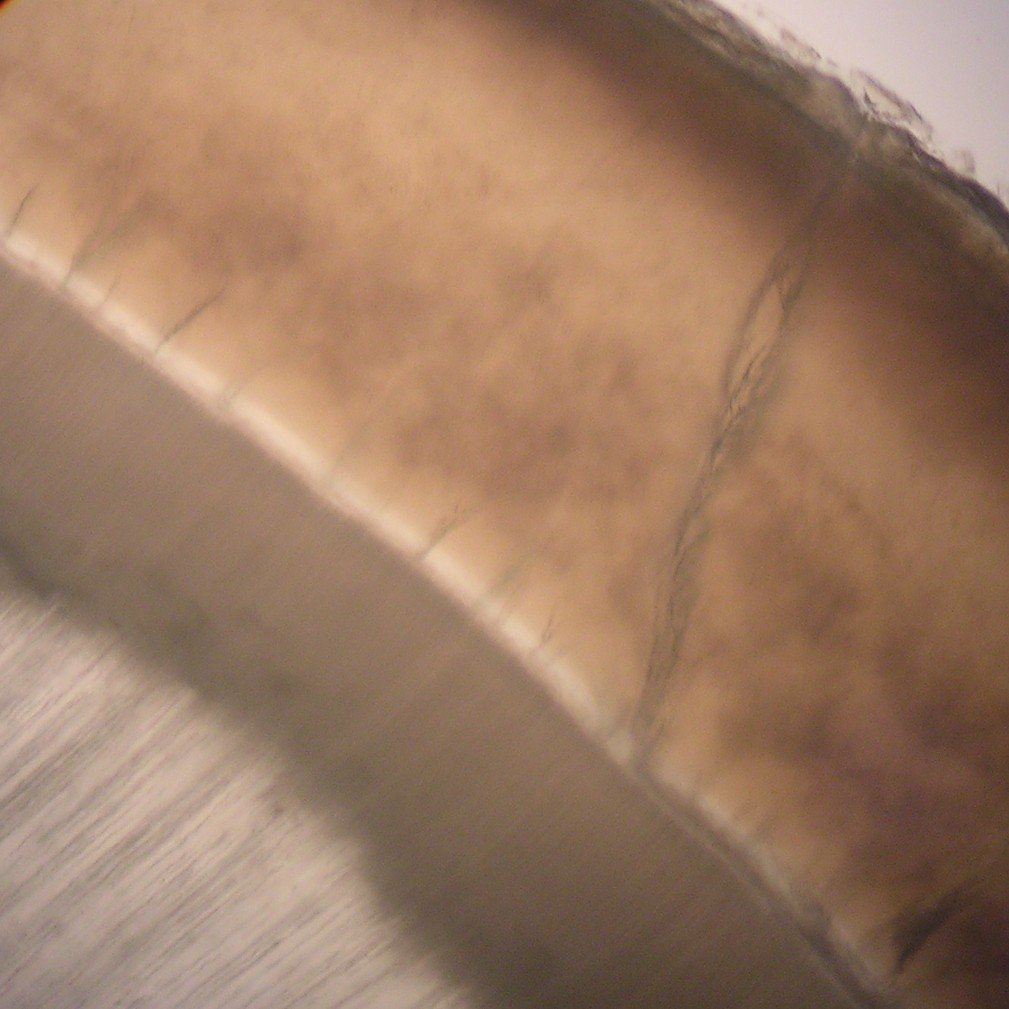
This is a histologic cross-section of a tooth and shows enamel (top right, slightly reddish with crack to the surface edge in corner) and dentin (bottom left, two slightly purplish light and then dark bands). The lightish boundary between them is the dentinoenamel junction. From this can be seen enamel tufts growing towards the top right.

Enamel tufts are hypomineralized ribbon-like structures that run longitudinally to the tooth axis and extend from the dentinoenamel junction (DEJ) one fifth to a third into the enamel. They are called tufts due to their wavy look within the enamel microstructure.

Biomechanically, enamel tufts are closed cracks or defects which, in their manner of propagating, act to prevent enamel fractures. This aspect is being studied to see how to make more fracture-resistant materials. However, they can also form without stress during enamel development.

Enamel tufts are most common in the enamel of molars of animals that crush hard food objects, such as nuts (crushed by apes) and shellfish (crushed by sea otters).

== Microstructure ==
Each tuft consists of several unconnected leaves that start near the dentinoenamel junction. These defects as they pass through the enamel rods to the surface become progressively more fragmented and fibrillar. Scanning electron micrography finds that there are two kinds: one that is continuous with the enamel-dentine membrane at the dentinoenamel junction and that is acid-resistant, and another that is made up of empty spaces between the prisms and hard walls covered with organic matter.

Enamel tufts are particularly common on low-crowned, blunt-cusped molars used in crushing; these are called "bunodonts".

== Development ==
The origin of enamel tufts is not fully understood. It appears, however, that they may arise during enamel development in areas where enamel rods are crowded at the boundaries where they are bundled together, creating periodic weakened mineral reduced planes. These weaknesses then produce transient longitudinal cracks in the transverse plane of the developing enamel.

Their formation has been attributed to stress and are considered a form of defect. However, stress upon the enamel is not needed to produce them since they occur in impacted third molars that are not affected by biting forces.

== Enamel fractures ==
Some sources consider tufts to be of no clinical significance. However, they have been noted to be an important potential source of enamel fractures that arise after extended use or overloading. It appears that, although enamel easily starts to form the fracture defects of enamel tufts, they then enable enamel to resist the further progress of these fractures, ultimately preventing mechanical failure. This fracture resistance is why tooth enamel is three times stronger than its constituent hydroxyapatite crystallites that make up its enamel rods.

Enamel tufts do not normally lead to enamel failure, due to these defects stabilizing potential fractures. The processes involved include the creation of stress shielding by increasing the compliance of enamel next to the dentin. Decussation is another factor by which cracks form wavy stepwise extensions that arrest their further development. Enamel tufts also self-heal through a process of being filled with protein rich fluids. Odontologically they can be filled by light-cured composite resin when applied in two applications.

== Animals with enamel tufts ==
While a common feature of animal dentition, enamel tufts are particularly found in animals that crush hard materials with their teeth such as nuts and mollusc shells. Tufts are found especially in the enamel of primates such as chimpanzees, orangutans and gorillas. They are also found in bears, pigs, peccaries, and sea otters.

== Biomimicry importance ==
Enamel is as brittle as glass and yet it can constantly withstand bite forces during chewing as high as 1,000 N many times a day. As such, it has been argued, that enamel tufts is an example of how nature has created a biomechanical solution to the problem of weak internal interfaces that laminate structures would otherwise have. The solutions involved (such as filling growing defects with fluids) has inspired scientists to make novel bioinspired (or biomimicry) materials.

== Not to be confused with ==
Enamel tufts are frequently confused with enamel lamellae, which are also enamel defects, but which differ in two ways: lamella are linear, and not branched, and they exist primarily extending from the enamel surface, through the enamel and towards the dentinoenamel junction, whereas enamel tufts project in the opposite direction.

Enamel tufts should also not be confused with the similar enamel spindles. Enamel spindles are also linear defects, similar to lamellae, but they too can be found only at the dentinoenamel junction, similar to enamel tufts. This is because they are formed by entrapment of odontoblast processes between ameloblasts prior to and during amelogenesis.
