= Methyl cyanoacrylate =

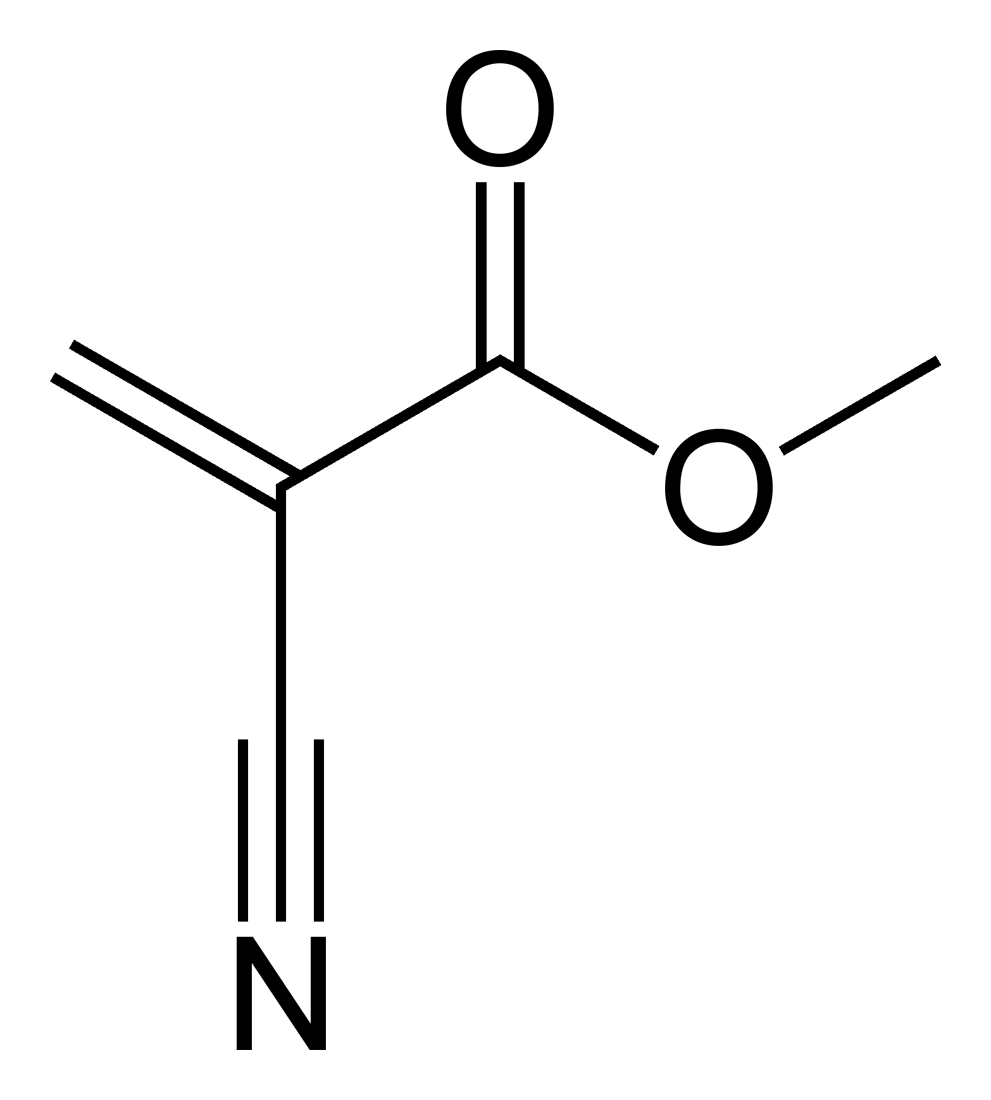

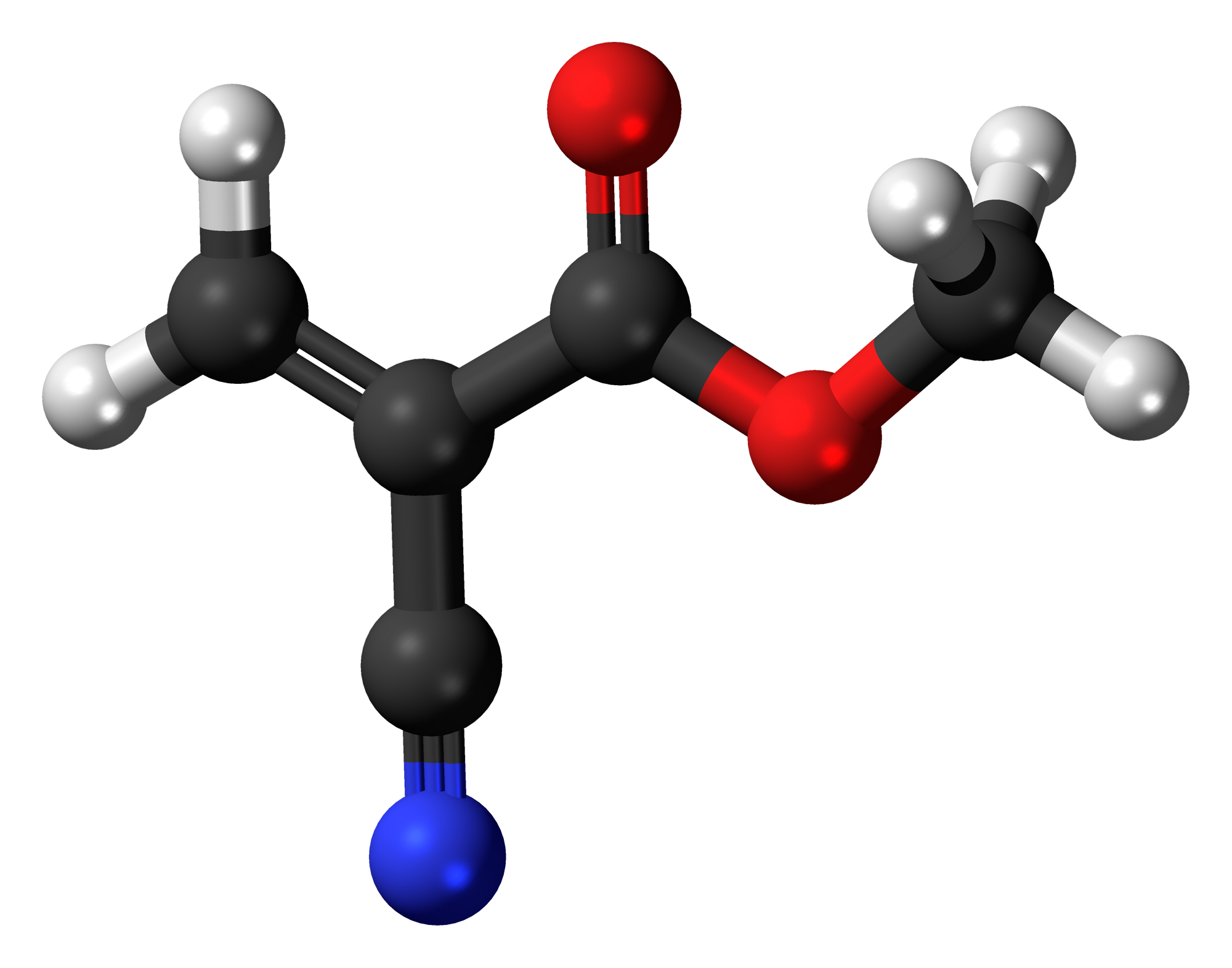

Names
- Preferred IUPAC name Methyl 2-cyanoprop-2-enoate
- Other names Methyl 2-cyanopropenoate Methyl 2-cyanoacrylate 2-Cyano-2-propenoic acid methyl ester MCA; Methyl alpha-cyanoacrylate Mecrylate; Ad/here; Adhere; CA 7 Cemedine 3000; Coapt; Cyanobond 5000; Eastman 910; Fimofix P 1048; Mecrilat; Mecrilate; Sicomet 7000; Three Bond 1701

Identifiers
CAS Number	137-05-3
3D model (JSmol)	Interactive image
ChemSpider	8387
ECHA InfoCard	100.004.796
PubChem CID	8711
UNII	WN7979561R
CompTox Dashboard (EPA)	DTXSID4025589
- InChI: InChI=1S/C5H5NO2/c1-4(3-6)5(7)8-2/h1H2,2H3 Key: MWCLLHOVUTZFKS-UHFFFAOYSA-N; InChI=1/C5H5NO2/c1-4(3-6)5(7)8-2/h1H2,2H3 Key: MWCLLHOVUTZFKS-UHFFFAOYAW
- SMILES: C=C(C(OC)=O)C#N

Properties
Chemical formula	C_{5}H_{5}NO_{2}
Molar mass	111.100 g·mol^{−1}
Density	1.1
Melting point	−40 °C (−40 °F; 233 K)
Boiling point	48 to 49 °C (118 to 120 °F; 321 to 322 K) (2.5–2.7 mmHg)
Solubility in water	30% (20 °C)
Vapor pressure	0.2 mmHg (25 °C)

Hazards
Flash point	79 °C; 174 °F; 352 K
- NIOSH (US health exposure limits)
PEL (Permissible)	None
REL (Recommended)	TWA 2 ppm (8 mg/m^{3}) ST 4 ppm (16 mg/m^{3})
IDLH (Immediate danger)	N.D.

Related compounds
Related; Cyanoacrylates	Ethyl cyanoacrylate Butyl cyanoacrylate Octyl cyanoacrylate
- Except where otherwise noted, data are given for materials in their standard state (at 25 °C [77 °F], 100 kPa). verify (what is ?) Infobox references

Methyl cyanoacrylate (MCA; also sometimes referred to as α-cyanoacrylate or alpha-cyanoacrylate) is an organic compound that contains several functional groups: a methyl ester, a nitrile, and an alkene. It is a colorless liquid with low viscosity. Its chief use is as the main component of cyanoacrylate glues, commonly named superglue. It can be encountered under many trade names. Methyl cyanoacrylate is less commonly encountered than ethyl cyanoacrylate.

It is soluble in acetone, methyl ethyl ketone, nitromethane, and dichloromethane. MCA polymerizes rapidly in presence of moisture.

== Safety ==
Heating the polymer causes depolymerization of the cured MCA, producing gaseous products which are a strong irritant to the lungs and eyes. With regard to occupational exposure to MCA, the National Institute for Occupational Safety and Health recommends workers do not exceed exposures over 2 ppm (8 mg/m^{3}) over an eight-hour workshift, or over 4 ppm (16 mg/m^{3}) over a short-term exposure.
