= 3-Octanol =

Names
- Preferred IUPAC name Octan-3-ol
- Other names ethylhexanol

Identifiers
CAS Number	589-98-0; (±): 20296-29-1; (+): 22658-92-0
3D model (JSmol)	Interactive image; (+): Interactive image
ChEBI	CHEBI:80945
ChEMBL	ChEMBL487998
ChemSpider	11043
ECHA InfoCard	100.008.790
EC Number	209-667-4; (±): 243-713-4
KEGG	C17144
PubChem CID	11527
UNII	73DZ0U3U1E
CompTox Dashboard (EPA)	DTXSID10862252
- InChI: InChI=1S/C8H18O/c1-3-5-6-7-8(9)4-2/h8-9H,3-7H2,1-2H3 Key: NMRPBPVERJPACX-UHFFFAOYSA-N; (+): InChI=1S/C8H18O/c1-3-5-6-7-8(9)4-2/h8-9H,3-7H2,1-2H3/t8-/m0/s1 Key: InChIKey=NMRPBPVERJPACX-QMMMGPOBSA-N
- SMILES: CCCCCC(CC)O; (+): [C@@H](CCCCC)(CC)O

Properties
Chemical formula	C_{8}H_{18}O
Molar mass	130.231 g·mol^{−1}
Density	0.818
Melting point	−45 °C (−49 °F; 228 K)
Boiling point	175 °C (347 °F; 448 K)
Refractive index (n_{D})	1.427

Hazards
Flash point	68 °C (154 °F; 341 K)
- Except where otherwise noted, data are given for materials in their standard state (at 25 °C [77 °F], 100 kPa). Infobox references

3-Octanol is an organic chemical compound and a chiral alcohol. It is a fatty alcohol that is poorly soluble in water but soluble in most organic solvents.
