= 1-Octanol =

Octanol
- Skeletal formula

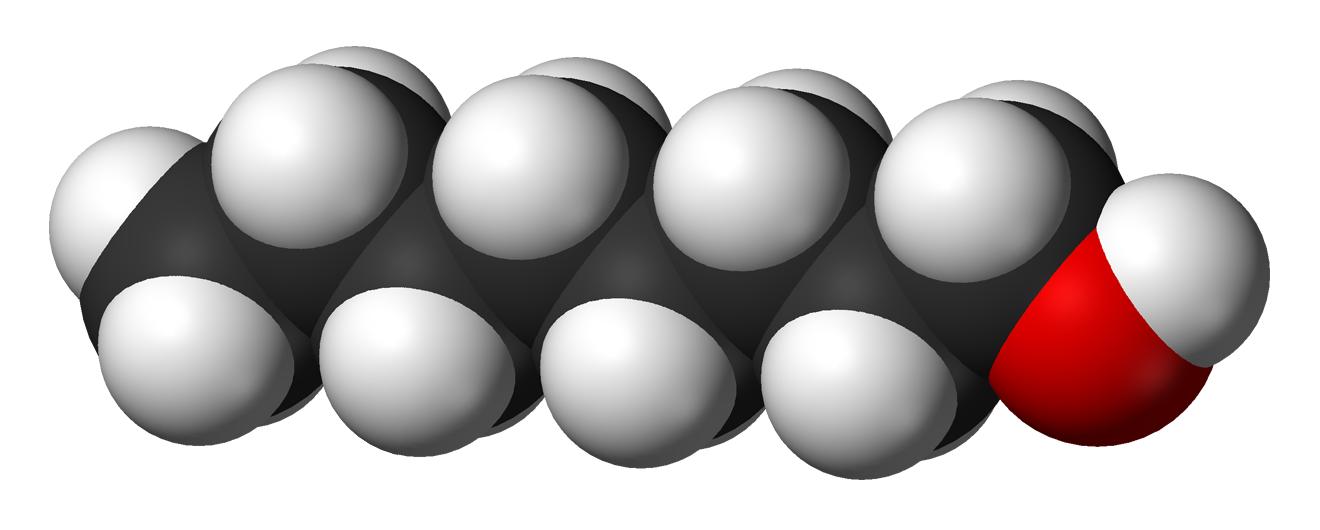
- Space-filling model

Names
- Preferred IUPAC name Octan-1-ol
- Other names 1-Octanol n-Octanol; Capryl alcohol Octyl alcohol

Identifiers
CAS Number	111-87-5
3D model (JSmol)	Interactive image
Abbreviations	OcOH n-OcOH nOcOH^{n}OcOH
Beilstein Reference	1697461
ChEBI	CHEBI:16188
ChEMBL	ChEMBL26215
ChemSpider	932
ECHA InfoCard	100.003.561
EC Number	203-917-6
Gmelin Reference	82528
IUPHAR/BPS	4278
KEGG	C00756
PubChem CID	957
UNII	NV1779205D
CompTox Dashboard (EPA)	DTXSID7021940
- InChI: InChI=1S/C8H18O/c1-2-3-4-5-6-7-8-9/h9H,2-8H2,1H3 Key: KBPLFHHGFOOTCA-UHFFFAOYSA-N; InChI=1/C8H18O/c1-2-3-4-5-6-7-8-9/h9H,2-8H2,1H3 Key: KBPLFHHGFOOTCA-UHFFFAOYAH
- SMILES: CCCCCCCCO

Properties
Chemical formula	C_{8}H_{18}O
Molar mass	130.231 g·mol^{−1}
Appearance	Colorless liquid
Odor	Aromatic
Density	0.83 g/cm^{3} (20 °C)
Melting point	−16 °C (3 °F; 257 K)
Boiling point	195 °C (383 °F; 468 K)
Solubility in water	0.3 g/L (20 °C)
Viscosity	7.36 cP

Hazards
- GHS labelling
Pictograms	(GHS07: Exclamation mark)
Signal word	Warning
Hazard statements	H319
Precautionary statements	P264, P280, P305+P351+P338, P337+P313
NFPA 704 (fire diamond)	1 2 0
- Except where otherwise noted, data are given for materials in their standard state (at 25 °C [77 °F], 100 kPa). verify (what is ?) Infobox references

1-Octanol, also known as octan-1-ol or simply octanol, is the organic compound with the molecular formula C_{8}H_{18}O or CH_{3}(CH_{2})_{7}OH. It is a fatty alcohol. Many other isomers are also known generically as octanols. 1-Octanol is manufactured for the synthesis of esters for use in perfumes and flavorings. It has a pungent odor. Esters of octanol, such as octyl acetate, occur as components of essential oils (grapefruit oil, orange oil, bergamot oil, mandarin oil and lime oil). It is used to evaluate the lipophilicity of pharmaceutical products.

== Preparation ==
Octanol is mainly produced industrially by the oligomerization of ethylene using triethylaluminium followed by oxidation of the alkylaluminium products. This route is known as the Ziegler alcohol synthesis. An idealized synthesis is shown:

Al(C_{2}H_{5})_{3} + 9 C_{2}H_{4} → Al(C_{8}H_{17})_{3}
Al(C_{8}H_{17})_{3} + 3 O + 3 H_{2}O → 3 HOC_{8}H_{17} + Al(OH)_{3}

The process generates a range of alcohols, which can be separated by distillation.

The Kuraray process defines an alternative route to 1-octanol, but using C4 + C4 building strategy. 1,3-Butadiene is dimerized concomitant with the addition of one molecule of water. This conversion is catalyzed by palladium complexes. The resulting doubly unsaturated alcohol is then hydrogenated.

== Water/octanol partitioning ==
Octanol and water are immiscible. The distribution of a compound between water and octanol is used to calculate the partition coefficient, P, of that molecule (often expressed as its logarithm to the base 10, log P). Water/octanol partitioning is a relatively good approximation of the partitioning between the cytosol and lipid membranes of living systems.

Many dermal absorption models consider the stratum corneum/ water partition coefficient to be well approximated by a function of the water/octanol partition coefficient of the form:

$$\log(K_{sc/w}) = a + b\log(K_{w/o})$$

Where a and b are constants, $K_{sc/w}$ is the stratum corneum/water partition coefficient, and $K_{w/o}$ is the water/octanol partition coefficient. The values of a and b vary between papers, but Cleek & Bunge have reported the values a = 0, b = 0.74.

== Properties and uses ==
With a flash point of 81 °C, 1-octanol is not seriously flammable, though its autoignition temperature is as low as 245 °C. 1-Octanol is mainly consumed as a precursor to perfumes. 1-Octanol hydrogen bonds to Lewis bases. It is a Lewis acid in the ECW model and its acid parameters are E_{A} = 0.85 and C_{A} = 0.87.

Octanol has a sedative and anesthetic effect in animal studies, though 1-octanol may not be the most potent isomer. 1-Octanol has been examined for controlling essential tremor and other types of involuntary neurological tremors because evidence indicates it can relieve tremor symptoms at lower doses than are required to obtain a similar level of symptomatic relief from consumption of ethanol, thereby reducing the risk of alcohol intoxication at therapeutic dosages.

== See also ==
- 2-Octanol
