= Isobutyl cyanoacrylate =

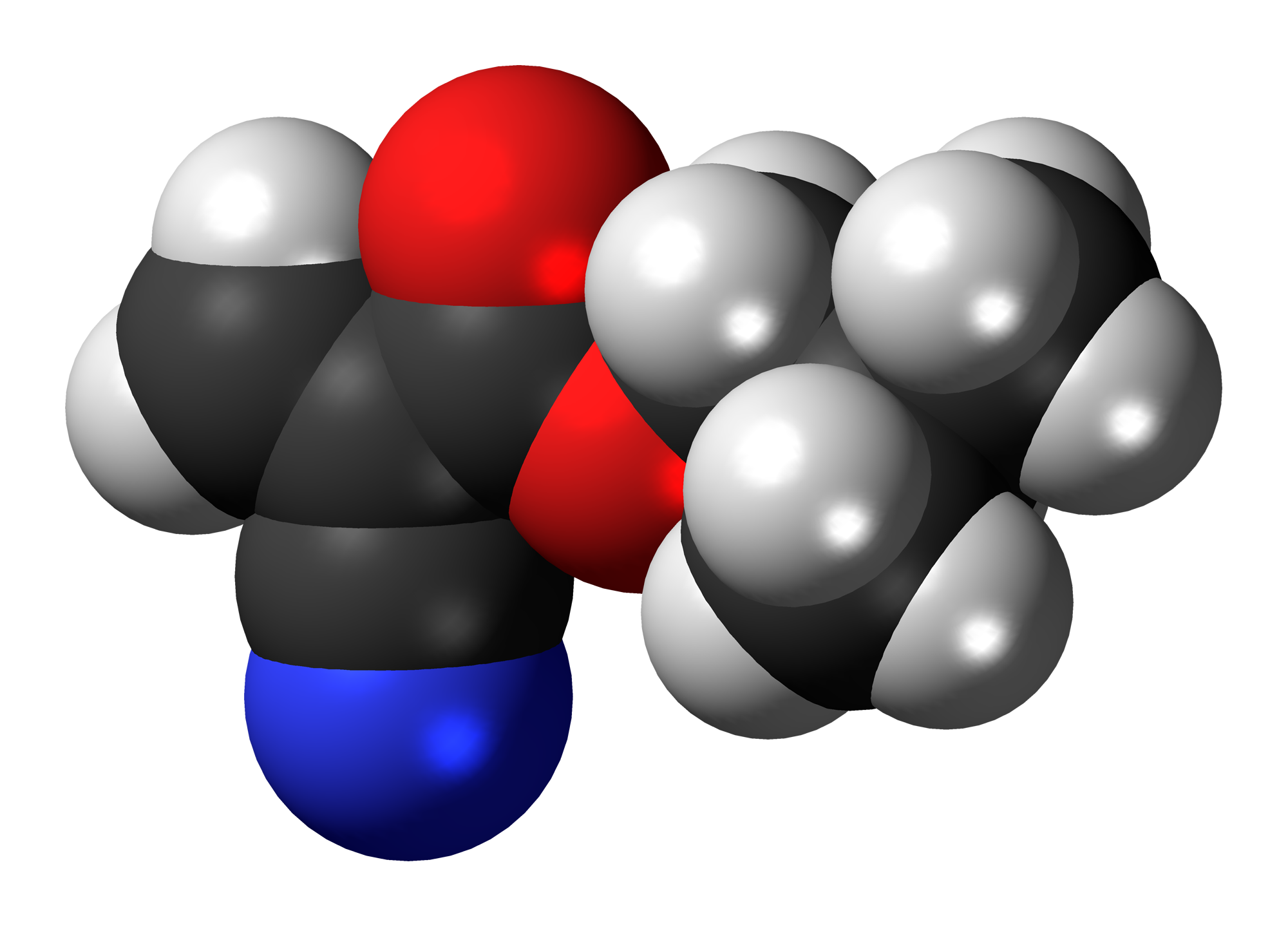

Names
- Preferred IUPAC name 2-Methylpropyl 2-cyanoprop-2-enoate
- Other names 2-Methylpropyl 2-cyanopropenoate Isobutyl 2-cyanoacrylate Bucrylate

Identifiers
CAS Number	1069-55-2
3D model (JSmol)	Interactive image
ChEMBL	ChEMBL2103950
ChemSpider	13427
ECHA InfoCard	100.012.690
KEGG	D03172
PubChem CID	14046
UNII	2HJV1F859Z
CompTox Dashboard (EPA)	DTXSID1061447
- InChI: InChI=1/C8H11NO2/c1-6(2)5-11-8(10)7(3)4-9/h6H,3,5H2,1-2H3 Key: QRWOVIRDHQJFDB-UHFFFAOYAQ
- SMILES: N#CC(=C)C(=O)OCC(C)C

Properties
Chemical formula	C_{8}H_{11}NO_{2}
Molar mass	153.181 g·mol^{−1}
- Except where otherwise noted, data are given for materials in their standard state (at 25 °C [77 °F], 100 kPa). Infobox references

Isobutyl cyanoacrylate is an isomer of butyl cyanoacrylate. It is used in medical procedures either to close incisions and lacerations without the use of sutures, or as an adjunct to strengthen the suturing. This use is possible because it is a bactericidal liquid monomer which, in the presence of small amounts of moisture, rapidly polymerizes to form a strong adhesive.
