= Butyl cyanoacrylate =

n-Butyl cyanoacrylate

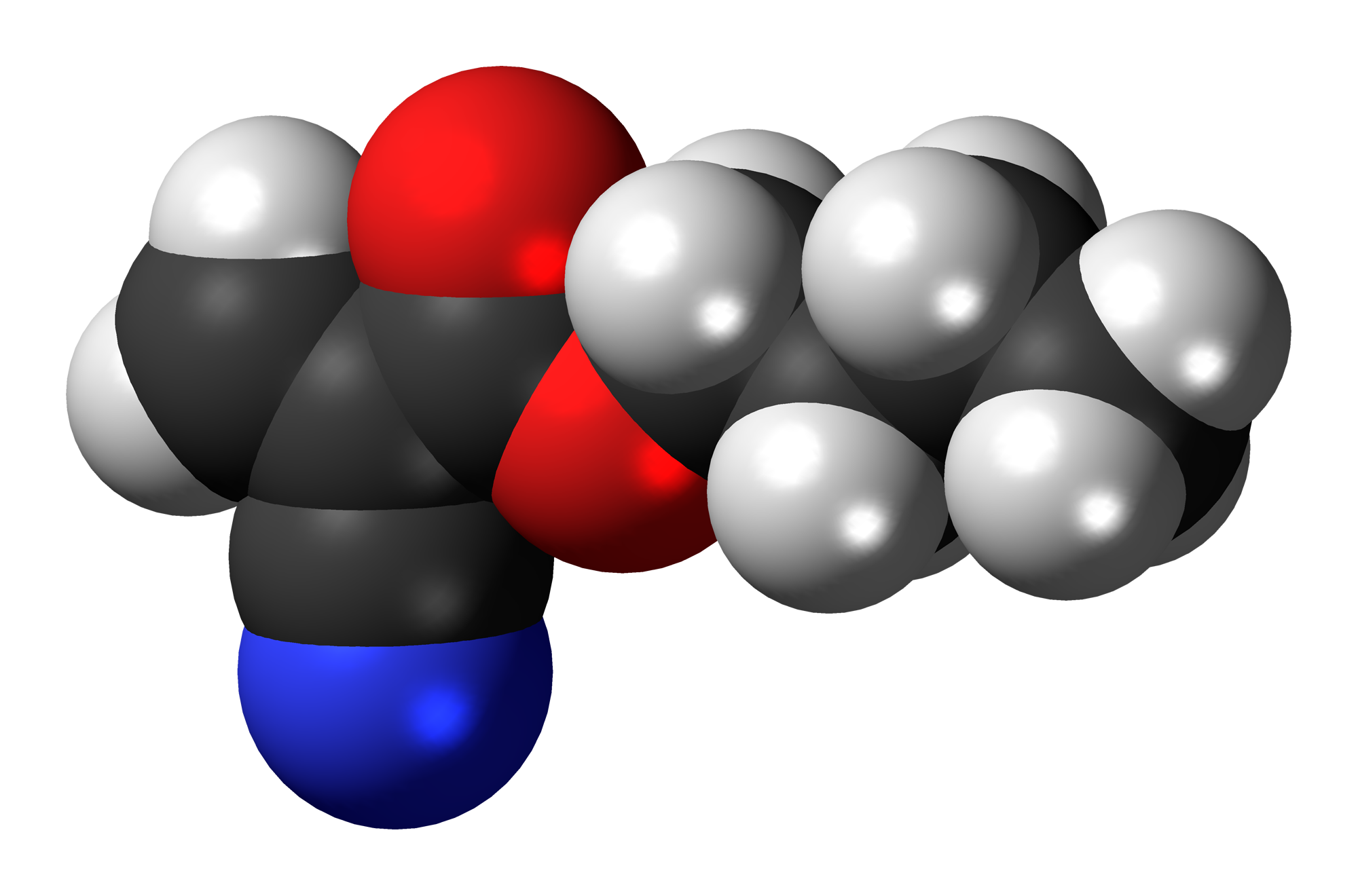

Names
- Preferred IUPAC name Butyl 2-cyanoprop-2-enoate
- Other names Butyl 2-cyanopropenoate Butyl 2-cyanoacrylate 2-Cyano-2-propenoic acid n-butyl ester n-Butyl 2-cyanoacrylate n-BCA; NBCA n-Butyl alpha-cyanoacrylate Enbucrilate (INN)

Identifiers
CAS Number	6606-65-1
3D model (JSmol)	Interactive image
ChEMBL	ChEMBL2104251
ChemSpider	21607
ECHA InfoCard	100.026.866
EC Number	229-552-2
PubChem CID	23087
UNII	F8CEP82QNP
CompTox Dashboard (EPA)	DTXSID5064417
- InChI: InChI=1/C8H11NO2/c1-3-4-5-11-8(10)7(2)6-9/h2-5H2,1H3 Key: JJJFUHOGVZWXNQ-UHFFFAOYAK
- SMILES: N#CC(=C)C(=O)OCCCC

Properties
Chemical formula	C_{8}H_{11}NO_{2}
Molar mass	153.181 g·mol^{−1}
Density	0.986 g/cm^{3} at 20 °C
Boiling point	69–72 °C (156–162 °F; 342–345 K) at 1.6 mmHg

Hazards
Flash point	> 80 °C (176 °F; 353 K)
- Except where otherwise noted, data are given for materials in their standard state (at 25 °C [77 °F], 100 kPa). Infobox references

n-Butyl cyanoacrylate (n-BCA, NBCA), a cyanoacrylate ester, is a butyl ester of 2-cyano-2-propenoic acid. It is a colorless liquid with a sharp, irritating odor. It is insoluble in water. Its chief use is as the main component of medical cyanoacrylate glues. It can be encountered under various trade names, e.g. Cutseal, MediBond, MediCryl, PeriAcryl, GluStitch, Topocryl, Gesika, VetGlu, Vetbond, LiquiVet, Indermil, LiquiBand, Histoacryl, IFABond, CutisSeal and others. The generic international nonproprietary name (INN) for NBCA is enbucrilate.

In medical and veterinary applications, NBCA, isobutyl cyanoacrylate, and octyl cyanoacrylate are commonly used. They are bacteriostatic and their use is usually painless. Butyl esters provide stronger bond, but are rigid. Octyl esters, while providing weaker bond, are more flexible. Blends of octyl cyanoacrylate and n-butyl cyanoacrylate are available (such as GLUture) which offer both flexibility and a strong bond. n-Butyl cyanoacrylate is also used for embolization of cerebral arteriovenous malformations before their surgical treatment.

NBCA in monomer form is soluble in acetone, methyl ethyl ketone, nitromethane, and methylene chloride. It polymerizes rapidly in presence of ionic substances such as moisture, blood, or tissue fluids.

NBCA has unique properties compared to other cyanoacrylates such as octyl cyanoacrylate or isoamyl cyanoacrylate. The polymerized form has excellent tensile strength and is very effective in closing surgical or wound incisions.

The closure of the wound or cut is quick (about 30 to 45 seconds) and the product has inherently some valuable bacteriostatic properties. The cosmetic outcome of the closure is comparable or generally better than an equivalent suture substitute with least scarring visible after three to six months.

Also important is the degradation properties of polymerized NBCA within the body. This property of NBCA has made it a very useful polymer to create various nanoparticles for delivery of drugs into the body with sustained release profiles.

Heating to higher temperatures causes pyrolysis and depolymerization of the cured glue, producing gaseous products strongly irritating to lungs and eyes.

== Medical applications ==
The medical applications of butyl cyanoacrylate include its use as an adhesive for lacerations of the skin, and in the treatment of bleeding from vascular structures. Butyl cyanoacrylate has been used to treat arteriovenous malformations by application of the glue into the abnormality through angiography.

In gastroenterology, butyl cyanoacrylate is used to treat bleeding gastric varices, which are dilated veins that occur in the setting of liver cirrhosis or thrombosis of the splenic vein. The gastric varices are accessed by endoscopy, which uses a flexible fibre-optic camera to enter the stomach. They are injected with a catheter needle inserted into the varix through the endoscope. Other sites of varices, including esophageal varices, duodenal varices and colonic varices. Gastric varices have also been obliterated with recurrent injection treatment with butyl cyanoacrylate.

== See also ==
- Isobutyl cyanoacrylate
- Methyl cyanoacrylate
- Ethyl cyanoacrylate
- Octyl cyanoacrylate
