= Cyanoacrylate =

Type of fast-acting adhesive

Structure of the backbone of a cyanoacrylate polymer

Cyanoacrylates are a family of strong, fast-acting adhesives with industrial, medical, and household uses that are derived from ethyl cyanoacrylate and related esters. The cyanoacrylate group in the monomer rapidly polymerizes in the presence of water to form long, strong chains.

Specific cyanoacrylates include methyl 2-cyanoacrylate (MCA), ethyl 2-cyanoacrylate (ECA, commonly sold under trade names such as "Super Glue" and "Krazy Glue"), n-butyl cyanoacrylate (n-BCA), octyl cyanoacrylate, and 2-octyl cyanoacrylate (used in medical, veterinary and first aid applications). Cyanoacrylate adhesives are sometimes known generically as instant glue, power glue, or super glue. The abbreviation "CA" is commonly used for industrial grade cyanoacrylate.

== Development ==
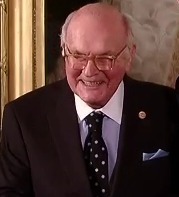
Harry Wesley Coover Jr. shortly before being awarded the National Medal of Technology and Innovation in 2010

The original patent for cyanoacrylate was filed in 1947 by the B.F. Goodrich Company as an outgrowth of a search for materials suitable for clear plastic gun sights for the war effort. In 1942, a team of scientists headed by Harry Coover Jr. stumbled upon a formulation that stuck to everything with which it came in contact. The team quickly rejected the substance for the wartime application, but in 1951, while working as researchers for Eastman Kodak, Coover and a colleague, Fred Joyner, rediscovered cyanoacrylates, then applied for a patent in 1954 which was issued in 1956. The two had realized its true commercial potential, and a form of the adhesive was first sold in 1958 under the name "Eastman #910" (later "Eastman 910").

During the 1960s, Eastman Kodak sold cyanoacrylate to Loctite, which in turn repackaged and distributed it under a different brand name "Loctite Quick Set 404". In 1971, Loctite developed its own manufacturing technology and introduced its own line of cyanoacrylate, called "Super Bonder". Loctite quickly gained market share, and by the late 1970s it was believed to have exceeded Eastman Kodak's share in the North American industrial cyanoacrylate market. National Starch and Chemical Company purchased Eastman Kodak's cyanoacrylate business and combined it with several acquisitions made throughout the 1970s forming Permabond. Other manufacturers of cyanoacrylate include LePage (a Canadian company acquired by Henkel in 1996), the Permabond Division of National Starch and Chemical, which was a subsidiary of Unilever. Together, Loctite, Eastman, and Permabond accounted for approximately 75% of the industrial cyanoacrylate market. As of 2019 Permabond continued to manufacture the original 910 formula.

== Polymerization ==
Chemical structure of ethyl cyanoacrylate, the precursor to many commercial adhesives

The most common monomer is ethyl cyanoacrylate, a chemical whose alkene (carbon–carbon double bond) is the part that polymerizes. Several related esters are known. To facilitate easy handling, a cyanoacrylate monomer is frequently formulated with an ingredient such as fumed silica to make it more viscous or gel-like. Formulations are available with additives to increase shear strength or creating a more impact resistant bond. Such additives may include rubber, as in Loctite's "Ultra Gel", or others which are not specified.

In general, the C=C groups rapidly undergo chain-growth polymerization in the presence of water (specifically hydroxide ions), forming long, strong chains, joining the bonded surfaces together. Cyanoacrylates typically have a relatively long on-part working time as long as two surfaces are not pressed together. Cyanoacrylate adhesives generally have a short shelf life—about one year from manufacture if unopened, and one month once opened, but this can be extended by refrigeration.

Polymerization of methyl 2-cyanoacrylate

== General properties ==
Cyanoacrylates are mainly used as adhesives. Thin layers bond effectively, thick layers much less so. They bond many substances, including human skin and tissues, natural fibres, cotton, wool, and leather.

Cyanoacrylate glue has a low shearing strength, which has led to its use as a temporary adhesive in cases where the piece needs to be sheared off later. Common examples include mounting a workpiece to a sacrificial glue block on a lathe, and tightening pins and bolts. It is also used in conjunction with another slower, but more resilient, adhesive as a way of rapidly forming a joint, which then holds the pieces in the appropriate configuration until the second adhesive has set.

Cyanoacrylate-based glue has a weak bond with smooth surfaces and as such easily gives to friction; a good example of this is the fact that cyanoacrylates may be removed from human skin by means of abrasives (e.g. sugar or sandpaper).

== Uses ==
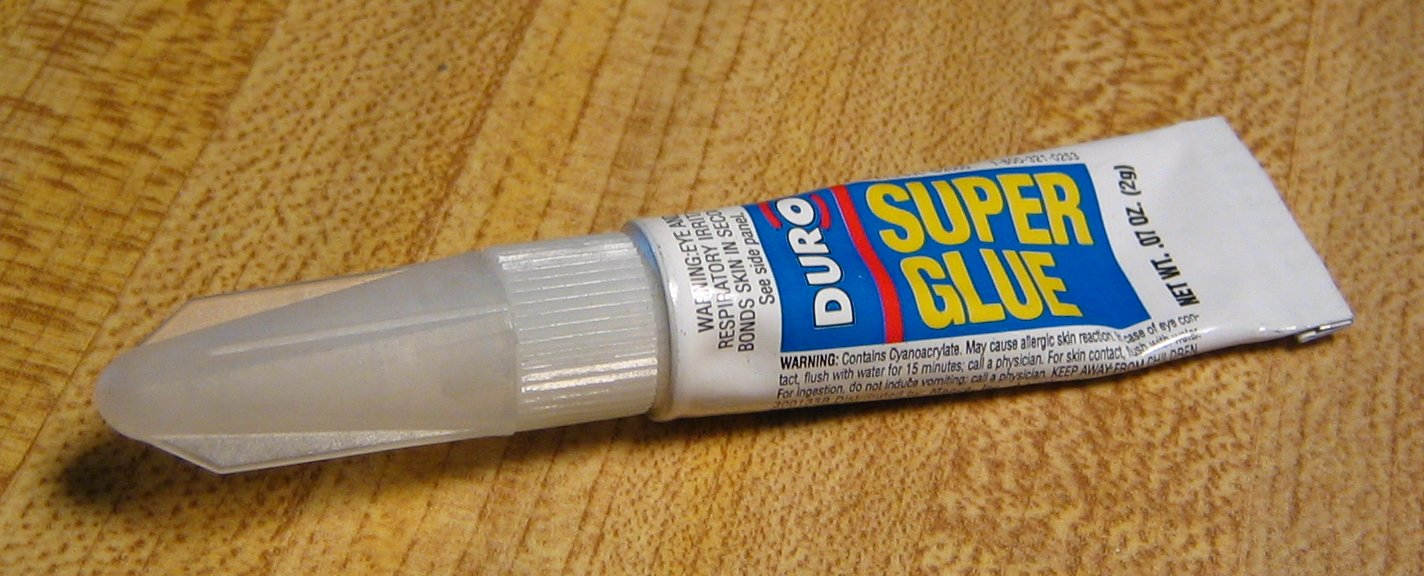
A tube of "Super Glue", a cyanoacrylate glue

=== Medical and veterinary ===
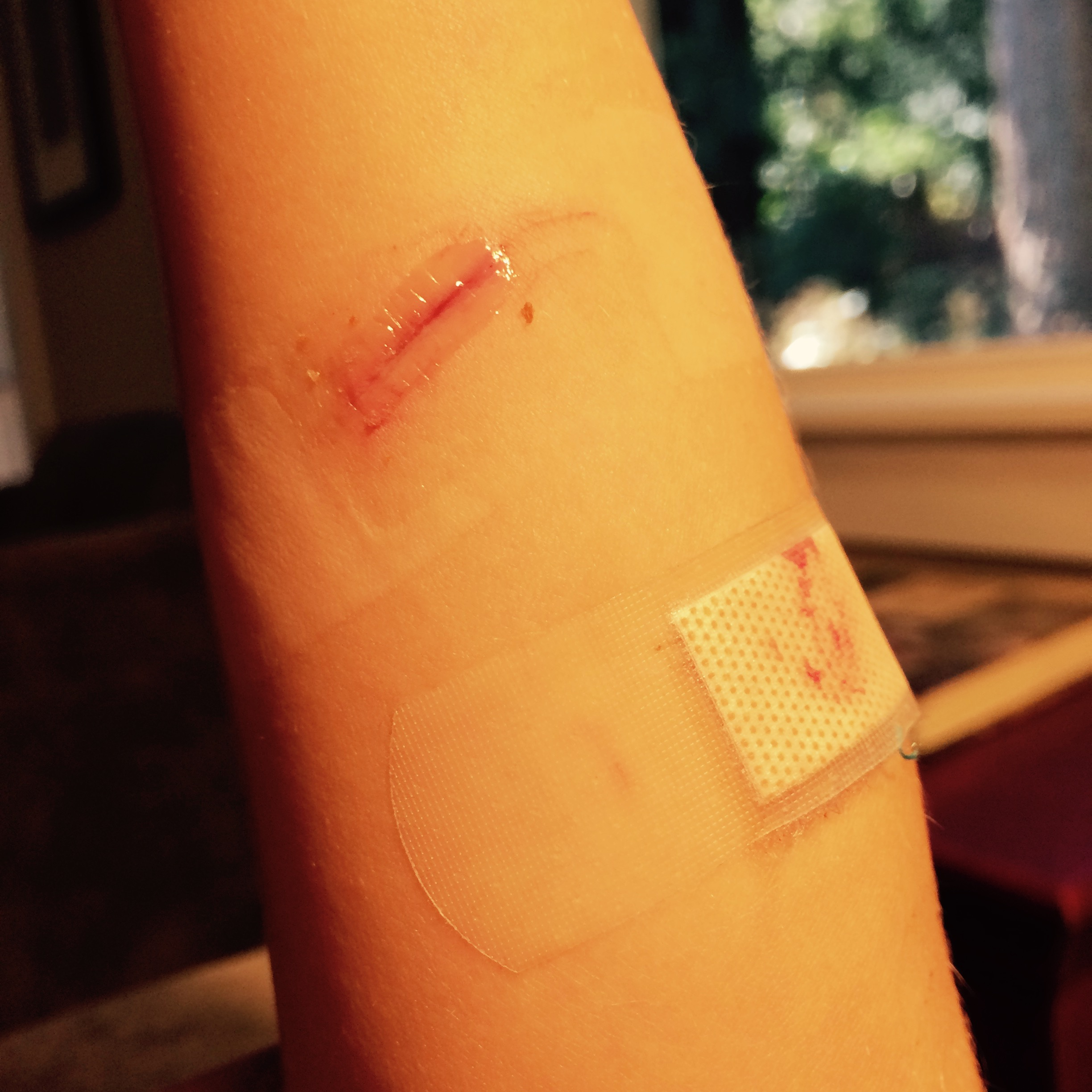
An incision wound closed with Dermabond, a cyanoacrylate-based medical adhesive

Cyanoacrylate glue is widely used in human and veterinary medicine. It was in veterinary use for mending bone, hide, and tortoise shell by the early 1970s or before. A cyanoacrylate spray was used in the Vietnam War to reduce bleeding in wounded soldiers until they could be taken to a hospital.

n-Butyl cyanoacrylate has been used medically since the 1970s. In the US, due to its potential to irritate the skin, the U.S. Food and Drug Administration (FDA) did not approve its use as a medical adhesive until 1998 with Dermabond (2-octyl cyanoacrylate). A 1986 independent study suggests that cyanoacrylate can be safer and more functional for wound closure than traditional suturing (stitches). Although cyanoacrylates are widely used for sutureless wound repair, "existing adhesives still lack sufficient adhesion strength to completely replace sutures and staples."

Some rock climbers use cyanoacrylate to repair damage to the skin on their fingertips. Similarly, stringed-instrument players can form protective finger caps (typically, when they lose their calluses due to inactivity or accidents) with cyanoacrylates. While the glue is not very toxic and wears off quickly with shed skin, applying large quantities of glue and its fumes directly to the skin can cause chemical burns.

While standard "superglue" is 100% ethyl 2-cyanoacrylate, many custom formulations (e.g., 91% ECA, 9% poly(methyl methacrylate), <0.5% hydroquinone, and a small amount of organic sulfonic acid, and variations on the compound n-butyl cyanoacrylate for medical applications) have come to be used for specific applications. Three cyanoacrylate compounds are available as topical skin adhesives: 2-Octyl cyanoacrylate is marketed as Dermabond, SurgiSeal, and LiquiBand Exceed. n-Butyl cyanoacrylate is marketed as Histoacryl, Indermil, GluStitch, GluSeal, PeriAcryl, and LiquiBand. The compound ethyl 2-cyanoacrylate is available as Epiglu.

The ester substituent has several effects upon the biocompatibility of the adhesive. Longer side chains result in higher flexibility of the cured adhesive allowing a better match for the flexibility of skin, and can result in a slower release of formaldehyde after curing. Alkoxy-ethyl substituents have also been investigated and have shown some promise as a medical adhesive.

=== Forensics ===
Cyanoacrylate is used as a forensic tool to capture latent fingerprints on non-porous surfaces like glass, plastic, etc. Cyanoacrylate is warmed to produce fumes that react with the invisible fingerprint residues and atmospheric moisture to form a white polymer (polycyanoacrylate) on the fingerprint ridges. The ridges can then be recorded. The developed fingerprints are, on most surfaces (except on white plastic or similar), visible to the naked eye. Invisible or poorly visible prints can be further enhanced by applying a luminescent or non-luminescent stain.

=== Cosmetics ===
Cyanoacrylate is used in the cosmetology and beauty industry as an eyelash extension glue, or a "nail glue" for some artificial nail enhancements such as nail tips and nail wraps, and is sometimes mistaken for eye drops causing accidental injury (adhesion and/or chemical eye injury).

=== Niche and hobbies ===
Cyanoacrylates are used to assemble prototype electronics (used in wire wrap), flying model aircraft, and as retention dressings for nuts and bolts. Their effectiveness in bonding metal and general versatility have made them popular among modeling and miniatures hobbyists.

Cyanoacrylate glue's ability to resist water has made it popular with marine aquarium hobbyists for fragmenting corals. The cut branches of hard corals, such as Acropora, can be glued to a piece of live rock (harvested reef coral) or Milliput (epoxy putty) to allow the new fragment to grow out. It is safe to use directly in the tank, unlike silicone which must be cured to be safe. However, as a class of adhesives, traditional cyanoacrylates are classified as having "weak" resistance to both moisture and heat although the inclusion of phthalic anhydride reportedly counteracts both of these characteristics.

Cyanoacrylate glue is also used frequently in aquascaping both freshwater and marine aquariums for the purpose of securing the rhizomes of live plants to pieces of wood or stone. Thin cyanoacrylate glue has application in woodworking. It can be used as a fast-drying, glossy finish. An oil, such as boiled linseed oil, may be used to control the rate at which the cyanoacrylate cures. Cyanoacrylate glue is also used in combination with sawdust (from a saw or sanding) to fill voids and cracks. These repair methods are used on piano soundboards, wood instruments, and wood furniture. Cyanoacrylate glue is also used in the finishing of pen blanks (wooden blanks for turning pens) that have been turned on a lathe by applying multiple thin layers to build up a hard, clear finish that can then be sanded and polished to a glossy finish.

Some hobby applications call for cyanoacrylate glue mixed with inorganic fillers such as baking soda (sodium bicarbonate) and calcium oxide.

== Safety issues ==
=== Skin injuries ===
Cyanoacrylate adhesives may make body parts adhere, and may cause skin to be torn off trying to separate them. Without force, however, the glue will spontaneously separate from the skin over time (up to four days). The glue can also cause chemical burns, and exposed skin should be washed with soap and warm water. Separation can be accelerated by applying vegetable oil or acetone near, on, and around the glue. Glue can cause serious injuries if it gets in the eyes; in such cases the eye(s) should be rinsed with lukewarm water for 15 minutes and medical care obtained.

=== Toxicity ===
Heating causes depolymerization of the cured polymers producing gaseous products that are highly irritating. They are immediately polymerized by the moisture in the membranes and become inert. These risks can be minimized by using cyanoacrylate in well-ventilated areas. About 5% of the population can become sensitized to cyanoacrylate fumes after repeated exposure, resulting in flu-like symptoms. Cyanoacrylate may also be a skin irritant, causing an allergic skin reaction. The American Conference of Governmental Industrial Hygienists (ACGIH) assign a threshold limit value exposure limit of 200 parts per billion. On rare occasions, inhalation may trigger asthma. There is no singular measurement of toxicity for all cyanoacrylate adhesives because of the large number of adhesives that contain various cyanoacrylate formulations.

The United Kingdom's Health and Safety Executive and the United States National Toxicology Program have concluded that the use of ethyl cyanoacrylate is safe and that additional study is unnecessary. The compound 2-octyl cyanoacrylate degrades much more slowly due to its longer organic backbone (series of covalently bonded carbon molecules) and the adhesive does not reach the threshold of tissue toxicity. Due to the toxicity issues of ethyl cyanoacrylate, the use of 2-octyl cyanoacrylate for sutures is preferred.

=== Reaction with cotton, wool, and other fibrous materials ===
Applying cyanoacrylate to some natural materials such as cotton (jeans, cotton swabs, cotton balls, and certain yarns or fabrics), leather or wool results in a powerful, rapid, exothermic reaction. This reaction also occurs with fiberglass and carbon fiber. The heat released may cause serious burns or release irritating white smoke. Material safety data sheets for cyanoacrylate instruct users not to wear cotton (jeans) or wool clothing, especially cotton gloves, when applying or handling cyanoacrylates.

== Solvents and debonders ==
Acetone, commonly found as a fraction of nail polish remover (or at hardware stores in pure form), is a widely available solvent capable of softening cured cyanoacrylate. Other solvents include nitromethane, dimethylformamide, dimethyl sulfoxide, and methylene chloride. Another viable solvent for removing cured cyanoacrylate is gamma-butyrolactone. Commercial debonders are also available, many based on propylene carbonate.

== Shelf life ==
Cyanoacrylate adhesives have a short shelf life. Date-stamped containers help to ensure that the adhesive is still viable. One manufacturer supplies the following information and advice:

When kept unopened in a cool, dry location such as a refrigerator at a temperature of about 55 °F (13 °C), the shelf life of cyanoacrylate will be extended from about one year from manufacture to at least 15 months. If the adhesive is to be used within six months, it is not necessary to refrigerate it. Cyanoacrylates are moisture-sensitive, and moving from a cool to a hot location will create condensation; after removing from the refrigerator, it is best to let the adhesive reach room temperature before opening. After opening, it should be used within 30 days. Open containers should not be refrigerated.

Another manufacturer says that the maximum shelf life of 12 months is obtained for some of their cyanoacrylates if the original containers are stored at 35 to 40 °F (2 to 4 °C). One manufacturer has given a very detailed explanation in answer to a question about shelf life, including the fact that cyanoacrylate adhesives contain an inhibitor to slow curing in the bottle; the amount of inhibitor affects shelf life (but a glue with more inhibitor can require accelerant to be applied for some applications).

Polymerization is nearly stopped, leading to an almost unlimited shelf life, by storing unopened at −4 °F (−20 °C), the typical temperature of a domestic freezer, and allowing the contents to reach room temperature before use. Opening a container while chilled may cause moisture from the air to condense in the container.

As cyanoacrylates age, they polymerize, become thicker, and cure more slowly. They can be thinned with a cyanoacrylate of the same chemical composition with lower viscosity.
