= DGL =

DGL could refer to:

== Medicine ==
- Deglycyrrhizinated licorice, a herbal supplement
- Diacylglycerol lipase, an enzyme

== Transport ==
- Dingle Road railway station, Wales (by code)
- IATA code for Douglas Municipal Airport (Arizona), United States
- Vehicle registration for Głogów County, Poland

== Other uses ==
- Postal code for Dingli, Malta
- Diocese of the Great Lakes, any of several Anglican and Episcopalian dioceses in North America
- District Grand Lodge, a subdivision of the United Grand Lodge of England
