= Pitting enamel hypoplasia =

Presence of rounded depressions in the surface enamel of teeth

Enamel hypoplasia can take a variety of forms, but all types are associated with a reduction of enamel formation due to disruption in ameloblast production. One of the most common types, pitting enamel hypoplasia (PEH), ranges from small circular pinpricks to larger irregular depressions. Pits also vary in how they occur on a tooth surface, some forming rows and others more randomly scattered. PEH can be associated with other types of hypoplasia, but it is often the only defect observed. Causes of PEH can range from genetic conditions to environmental factors, and the frequency of occurrence varies substantially between populations and species, likely due to environmental, genetic and health differences. The most striking example of this is in Paranthropus robustus, with half of all primary molars, and a quarter of permanent molars, displaying PEH defects, thought to be caused by a specific genetic condition, amelogenesis imperfecta.

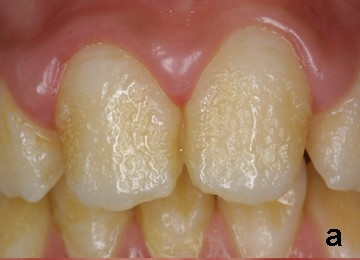
Pitting enamel hypoplasia, in an individual with amelogenesis imperfecta.

It is not always clear why PEH forms instead of other hypoplasia types, particularly linear enamel hypoplasia. However, the position on the crown, the tooth type and the cause of the disruption are all likely contributing factors. It has been suggested that because it is relatively rare to have both linear enamel hypoplasia and PEH, these types of defects may be commonly caused by different factors.

Each pit is linked to the ceasing of ameloblasts at a particular point in enamel formation. Sometimes, only a couple of ameloblasts stop forming enamel, leading to small PEH defects, with large pits forming when hundreds of these enamel-forming cells stop production. This does not occur in other forms of enamel hypoplasia, such as linear and plane-form, in which all ameloblast activity is affected. Typically with PEH described in archaeological reports, researchers can not specify a cause, with a non-specific stress often concluded. However, in modern clinical studies it is often possible to suggest a cause and these can include the following conditions:

- hypocalcaemia
- vitamin D deficiency
- amelogenesis imperfecta
- nutritional deficiency
- maternal diabetes mellitus
- congenital syphilis
- premature birth
- low birth weight
- hypoparathyroidism
- neonatal tetany
- kernicterus
