= Xylitol kinase =

Class of enzymes

Identifiers
- EC no.: 2.7.1.122
- CAS no.: 91273-86-8

Databases
- IntEnz: IntEnz view
- BRENDA: BRENDA entry
- ExPASy: NiceZyme view
- KEGG: KEGG entry
- MetaCyc: metabolic pathway
- PRIAM: profile
- PDB structures: RCSB PDB PDBe PDBsum
- Gene Ontology: AmiGO / QuickGO
Search
- PMC: articles
- PubMed: articles
- NCBI: proteins

Xylitol kinase (EC 2.7.1.122) is an enzyme that catalyzes the chemical reaction

ATP +
xylitol
ADP +
xylitol 5-phosphate

The enzyme characterised from Streptococcus mutans converts xylitol to its monophosphate, xylitol 5-phosphate, by transferring a phosphate group from the cofactor, adenosine triphosphate (ATP), which is converted to adenosine diphosphate (ADP).

This enzyme is a transferase, specifically one transferring phosphorus-containing groups (phosphotransferases) with an alcohol group as acceptor. The systematic name of this enzyme class is ATP:xylitol 5-phosphotransferase.
