= Neath (disambiguation) =

Neath is a nigh-coastal town in the South Wales Valleys.

Neath may also refer to:

== South Wales ==
- River Neath, through Powys and Neath Port Talbot
  - Vale of Neath, its surrounding valley
- Neath (UK Parliament constituency)
- Neath (Senedd constituency)
- Neath RFC, Wales' oldest rugby club
- Neath F.C., a defunct, association football club (2005–2012)

== Elsewhere ==
- Neath, New South Wales, a village near the City of Cessnock, Australia
- Neath, Pennsylvania, United States
