= Enamel hypoplasia =

Lack of tooth enamel

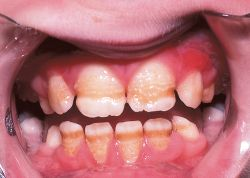
- Specialty: Dentistry

Enamel hypoplasia is a defect of the teeth in which the enamel is deficient in quantity, caused by defective enamel matrix formation during enamel development, as a result of inherited and acquired systemic condition(s). It can be identified as missing tooth structure and may manifest as pits or grooves in the crown of the affected teeth, and in extreme cases, some portions of the crown of the tooth may have no enamel, exposing the dentin. It may be generalized across the dentition or localized to a few teeth. Defects are categorized by shape or location. Common categories are pit-form, plane-form, linear-form, and localised enamel hypoplasia. Hypoplastic lesions are found in areas of the teeth where the enamel was being actively formed during a systemic or local disturbance. Since the formation of enamel extends over a long period of time, defects may be confined to one well-defined area of the affected teeth. Knowledge of chronological development of deciduous and permanent teeth makes it possible to determine the approximate time at which the developmental disturbance occurred. Enamel hypoplasia varies substantially among populations and can be used to infer health and behavioural impacts from the past. Defects have also been found in a variety of non-human animals.

== Causes ==
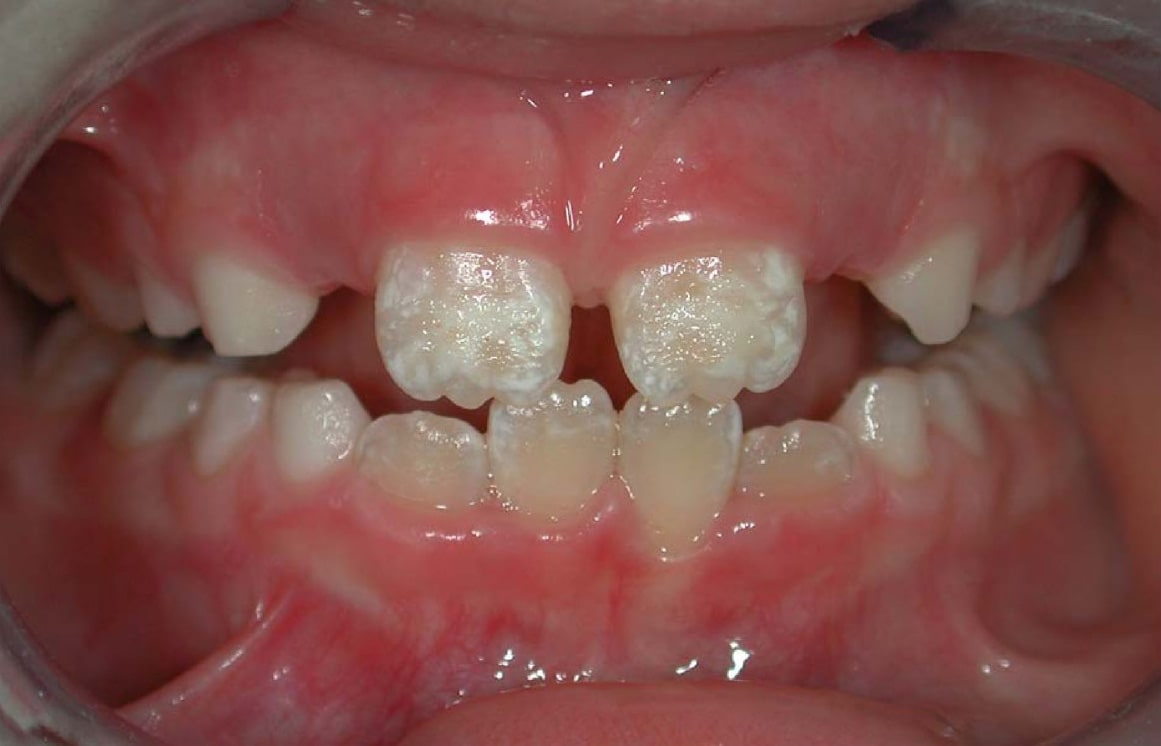
Irreversible enamel defects caused by an untreated celiac disease. They may be the only clue to its diagnosis, even in absence of gastrointestinal symptoms, but are often confused with fluorosis, tetracycline discoloration, or other causes. The National Institutes of Health include a dental exam in the diagnostic protocol of celiac disease.

Enamel hypoplasia is believed to result from the dysfunction of ameloblasts—enamel-producing cells—either for a short period of time or throughout their lifespan. Enamel hypoplasia has a wide variety of known causes. Some causes are hereditary and others are from environmental exposure. The severity and localization of disease presentation is dependent on the timing and stage of tooth development in which the defective enamel formation occurred.

Hereditary causes of enamel hypoplasia include:

- Primary abnormalities in enamel development, such as amelogenesis imperfecta
- Certain dermatological conditions, such as Ehlers–Danlos syndrome
- Other complex hereditary conditions such as Usher syndrome, Seckel syndrome, Treacher Collins syndrome, Heimler syndrome and Ellis–Van Creveld syndrome, Down syndrome, Hypophosphatasia, Regional odontodysplasia, Cleft lip and palate, Vitamin D–resistant rickets.

Environmental causes of enamel hypoplasia include:

- Nutritional deficits, such as Vitamin D, iron or calcium deficiency
- Birth injury or preterm birth
- Smoking during pregnancy
- Trauma
- Radiation
- Certain infections (e.g. congenital syphilis, cytomegalovirus, congenital rubella)
- Certain diseases (such as undiagnosed and untreated celiac disease, chicken pox, congenital syphilis)
- High fever
- Hypoxia (i.e. from severe cardiac defect)
- Excessive fluoride exposure (dental fluorosis)
- Tetracycline
- Vitamin A, C, or D deficiency

== Clinical relevance ==
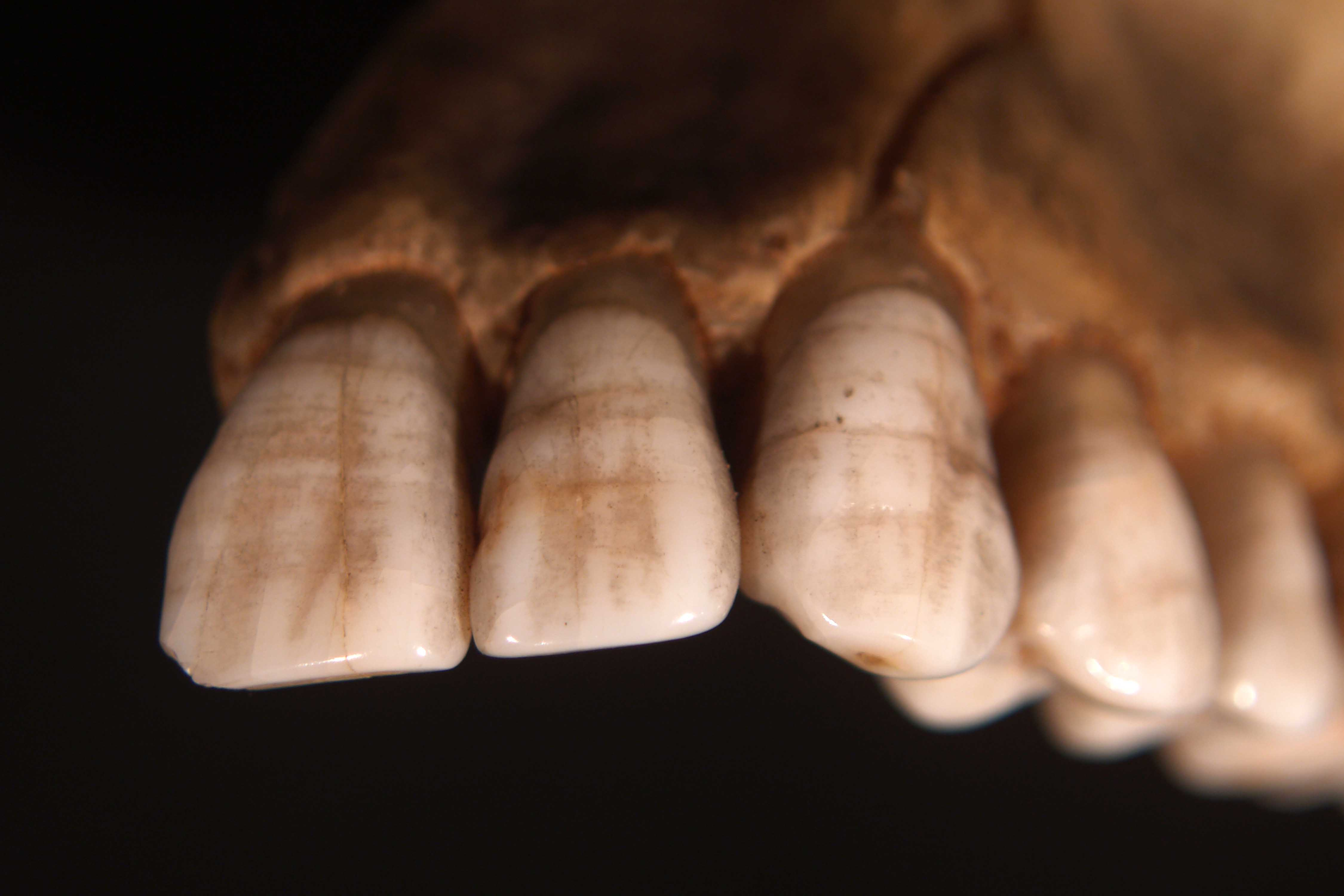
Teeth displaying enamel hypoplasia lines, linear defects of enamel that form during crowns development as a result of periods of nutritional stress or disease during infancy and childhood

Enamel hypoplasia is a risk factor for dental caries in children including early childhood caries (ECC), which continues to be a burden for many children. This association has been identified as significant and independent, and is believed that the formation of pits and missing enamel provides a suitable local environment for adhesion and colonization of cariogenic bacteria. Historically, enamel hypoplasia has been under-appreciated as a risk factor for ECC.

Developmental defects in enamel that affect tooth appearance in the esthetic zone (i.e. upper front teeth) may cause individuals to experience social embarrassment or anxiety regarding the appearance of their teeth.

=== Treatment ===
Dental sealants may be indicated for the prevention of caries in hypoplastic pit and fissure systems.

According to clinical trials, topical fluoride treatment in the form of gel or varnish is effective in preventing tooth decay in children with enamel defects. Treatment with other topical agents, such as calcium phosphate (CPP-ACP), may also be effective in the remineralization of areas with congenital or carious enamel defects.

In decayed teeth with enamel defects, only bonded restorations (e.g. glass ionomer, polyacid-modified composite resin and not amalgam) should be placed and cavity margins should not be placed in areas of defective enamel as this may lead to marginal leakage and recurrent decay. Stainless steel crowns with conservative preparation may be an effective method to eliminate sensitivity and prevent further breakdown in teeth with enamel defects requiring full-coverage crowns.

== Other conditions affecting enamel development ==
Hypomineralization or hypocalcification, as opposed to hypoplasia, refers to a decrease in the mineral content of the enamel, not the total amount present. It can vary in its presentation, and teeth may appear visually normal or highly translucent. Affected enamel is softer and more susceptible to acid, wear and decay.

=== Molar-incisor hypomineralization ===
Molar-incisor hypomineralization (MIH) is a condition in which there are areas of hypomineralized or hypomatured enamel on the crowns of permanent molars and incisors. In these cases, teeth may lose their weakened enamel shortly after eruption and are highly susceptible to dental caries. Affected teeth are highly sensitive to chemical and thermal irritants, and may also be difficult to obtain anesthesia. The causes of MIH are thought to be similar to those of other forms of enamel hypoplasia, but occur concurrently with crown development in the permanent molars and incisors (birth to approximately 3 years of age).

=== Turner's hypoplasia ===
Turner's hypoplasia or Turner's tooth is a presentation of enamel hypoplasia that normally affects only a single tooth. Its causes can be the same as other forms of enamel hypoplasia, but it is most commonly associated with trauma to a primary maxillary central incisor and the subsequent developmental disturbance of the underlying permanent tooth. This may also result in dilaceration of the root of the permanent tooth.
