= Streptococcus sobrinus =

Scientific classification
- Domain: Bacteria
- Kingdom: Bacillati
- Phylum: Bacillota
- Class: Bacilli
- Order: Lactobacillales
- Family: Streptococcaceae
- Genus: Streptococcus
- Species: S. sobrinus

Binomial name
- Streptococcus sobrinus (ex Coykendall 1974) Coykendall 1983

Species of bacterium

Streptococcus sobrinus is a Gram-positive, catalase-negative, non-motile, and anaerobic member of the genus Streptococcus.

== Pathology ==
Streptococcus sobrinus in conjunction with the closely related species Streptococcus mutans are pathogenic within humans and enhances the formation of caries within teeth. Biofilm from the mixture of sugar and plaque create a suitable environment for S. sobrinus to grow. S. sobrinus is more closely connected with the prevalence of caries than S. mutans. S. sobrinus is also affiliated with early childhood caries, which are responsible for the majority of dental abscesses and toothaches in children. Children generally acquire S. sobrinus strains from their mother, but the relatively high consumption of sugars by minors facilitates bacterial growth and threatens the onset of early childhood tooth decay. S. sobrinus has also been documented within the teeth of rats.

== History ==
Streptococcus sobrinus was discovered by the French biologist Louis Pasteur in 1887 along with other human pathogens. The full genome of S. sobrinus has been sequenced, and the related species S. mutans has also been fully sequenced.

== Symbiosis ==
Extracellular long-chained glucans synthesized from sucrose via glucosyltransferase enzymes help accumulate S. sobrinus on tooth enamel surfaces. The glucans provide a shelter for bacterial colonization, and the protected environment creates the perfect nesting ground for S. sobrinus and other microorganisms to sustain a stable community in the form of dental plaque. S. sobrinus in turn releases lactic acid in the anaerobic metabolism of glucose. Lactic acid demineralizes tooth enamel and fosters the initiation of dental caries. S. sobrinus has an optimal growth temperature of 37 °C and thrives in a slightly acidic environment at a pH of 6.3. This makes the human mouth a suitable habitat due to its acidic characteristics, favorable body temperature, and significant amount of food sugars passing through the mouth on a daily basis. However, these traits also indicate that S. sobrinus has a difficult time surviving outside the host of the human teeth.

== Antibacterials ==
In 1995 a paper by Meurman et al. tested Lactobacillus rhamnosus for inhibitory properties, although this relationship was only observed with a weak correlation at a pH below 5. Lectin from Talisia esculenta and Labramin from Labramia bojeri seeds were found to inhibit the adherence of S. sobrinus to tooth enamel, but had no effect on the growth of the population itself. A study by Sun et al. in 2009, tested a vaccine for S. sobrinus, and initial tests have been successful in providing protection.
