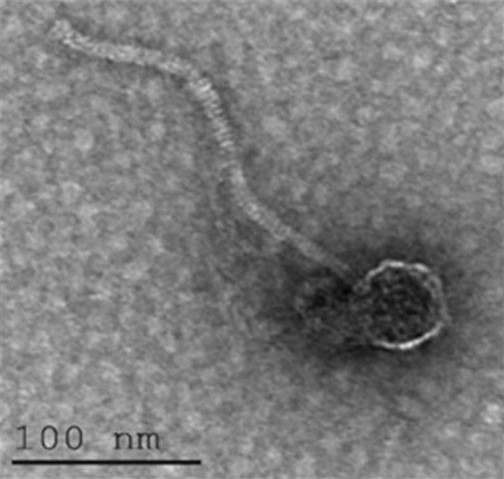
- TEM image of a SMHBZ8 virion

Virus classification
- (unranked): Virus
- Realm: Duplodnaviria
- Kingdom: Heunggongvirae
- Phylum: Uroviricota
- Class: Caudoviricetes
- Family: Aliceevansviridae

Genera
- Brussowvirus; Moineauvirus; Vansinderenvirus

= Aliceevansviridae =

Family of viruses

Aliceevansviridae is a family of viruses in the class Caudoviricetes. The family was announced in 2022 and contains three genera, along with an unofficial species unassigned to a genus, SMHBZ8.

== Etymology ==
The family's name, Aliceevans, is in honor of Alice Catherine Evans (1881–1975), an American microbiologist, the suffix -viridae is the standard suffix for virus families.
