= Plane-form enamel hypoplasia =

Tooth deformity with regions of little to no surface enamel

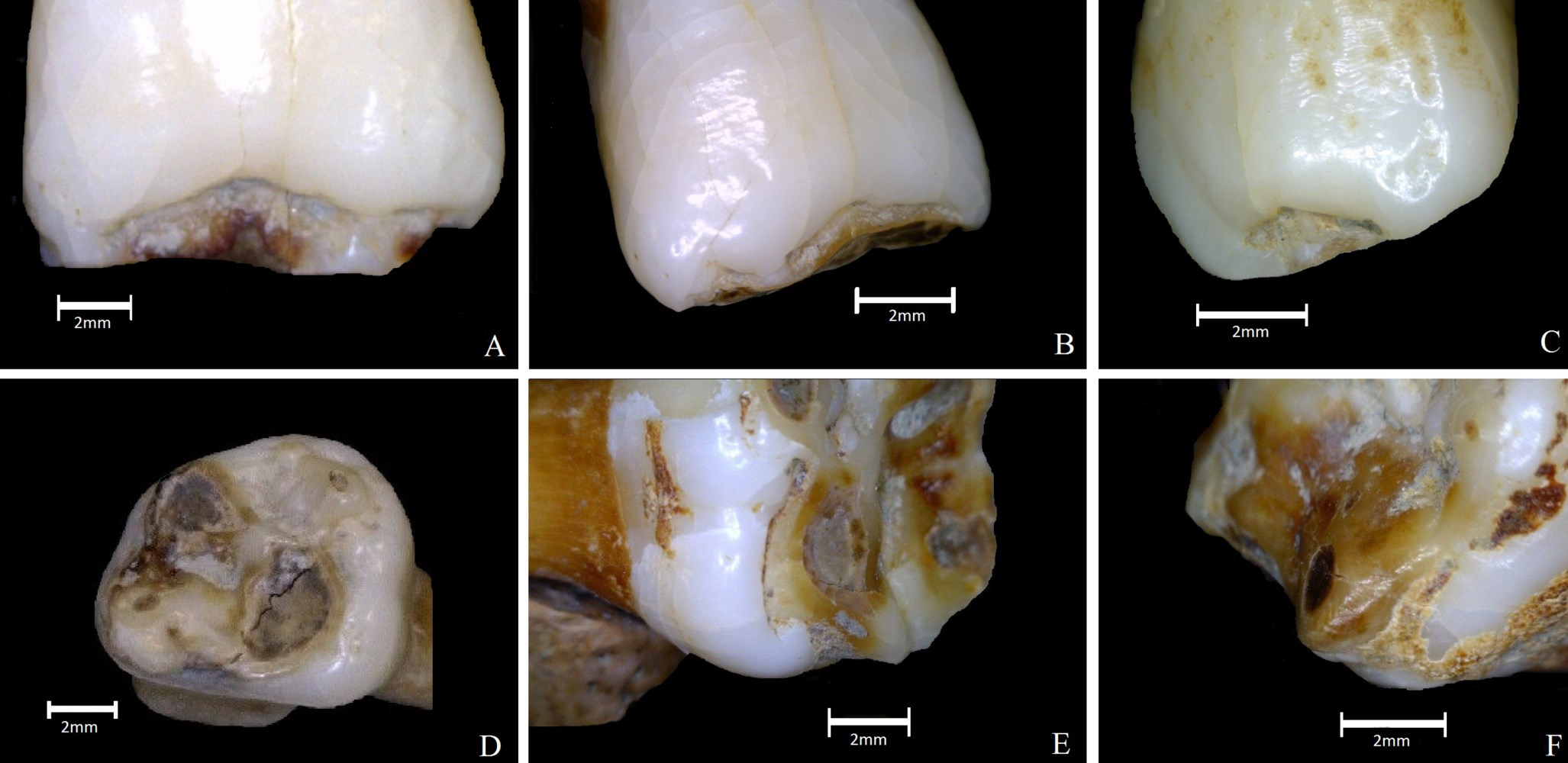
Example of an individual with plane-form enamel hypoplasia. From a British Roman site.

Plane-form enamel hypoplasia is often seen as the most severe type of enamel hypoplasia, and results from enamel matrix formation stopping, resulting in areas of crown with little or no dental enamel deposition. With plane form meaning the surface is smooth and flat. A relatively short period of severe stress can potentially lead to a very large defect. Plane-form enamel hypoplasia can be caused by a variety of factors, including severe illness/malnutrition, as well as specific conditions such as amelogenesis imperfecta and congenital syphilis. In severe cases enamel can be completely missing from areas of the crown, exposing the underlying dentine. This condition has been recorded in history since at least the 18th and 19th century. A study was done on a 15-year-old female that was alive during the 18th and 19th century, and she presented enamel hypoplasia.

== Signs and symptoms ==
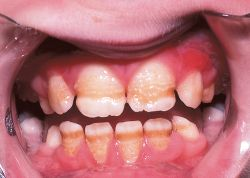
Example of teeth grooving and enamel discoloration.

Signs of plane-form enamel hypoplasia can be observed through pitting, depressions, and grooves seen on the surface of the teeth. This disease can solely affects a person's teeth, causing the enamel on one's teeth to erode. Common signs include white spotting and yellow or orange discoloration on the tooth surface. Patients with this condition often experience weakened and sensitive teeth. Progressive eroding of the enamel causes the teeth to become more sensitive, leading to discomfort when eating or drinking.

== Cause ==
Plane-form enamel hypoplasia is a dental condition that is distinguished by defects in the teeth enamel, that can occur due to genetic or environmental factors. It is common for the disease to occur during the developmental stages of the teeth, and childhood illnesses, such as respiratory infections, are often linked to disturbance of the enamel formation.

A lack of essential nutrients can delay enamel development, leading to weaker, underdeveloped enamel and contributes to cases of plane-form enamel hypoplasia. Proper intake of vitamins such as A, C, and D, along with minerals like calcium are crucial for ensuring enamel strength. To prevent this condition, maintaining a balanced diet or supplementing a diet deficient in these nutrients is vital.

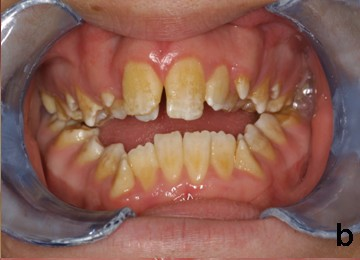
Example of amelogenesis imperfecta along with pitted enamel.

Prenatal factors can also affect enamel development. Health conditions such as maternal malnutrition, infections, and exposure to harmful substances during pregnancy have been linked to enamel deficiency in the fetus. Preventative measures include limiting exposure to harmful chemicals, maintaining a nutrient-rich diet, and attending regular checkups during pregnancy.

Amelgoenesis imperfecta, Usher syndrome, 22q11 syndrome, and Heimler syndrome are all associated with enamel hypoplasia, due to these condition disrupting the normal enamel process.

== Mechanism ==
Plane-form enamel hypoplasia is a condition resulting from disruptions within the normal enamel development process. Enamel formation beings during the early stages of tooth development and is commonly affected during childhood. Enamel formation is facilitated by specialized cells known as ameloblasts. These specialized cells secrete an enamel matrix that mineralizes over the teeth, forming the hard outer surface of the teeth.

Disruption in the function or production of ameloblasts can lead to deficiency's within the enamel formation. Factors such as nutrients intake, prenatal factors, and genetic conditions can disrupt the formation of enamel in any of the growth stages leading to things such as plane-form enamel hypoplasia.

The severity of Plane-form enamel hypoplasia is dependent of the duration and intensity of the contributing factors. Longer or more severe disruptions within the enamel formation are associated with more pronounced effects on tooth deformation and integrity.

== Diagnosis ==
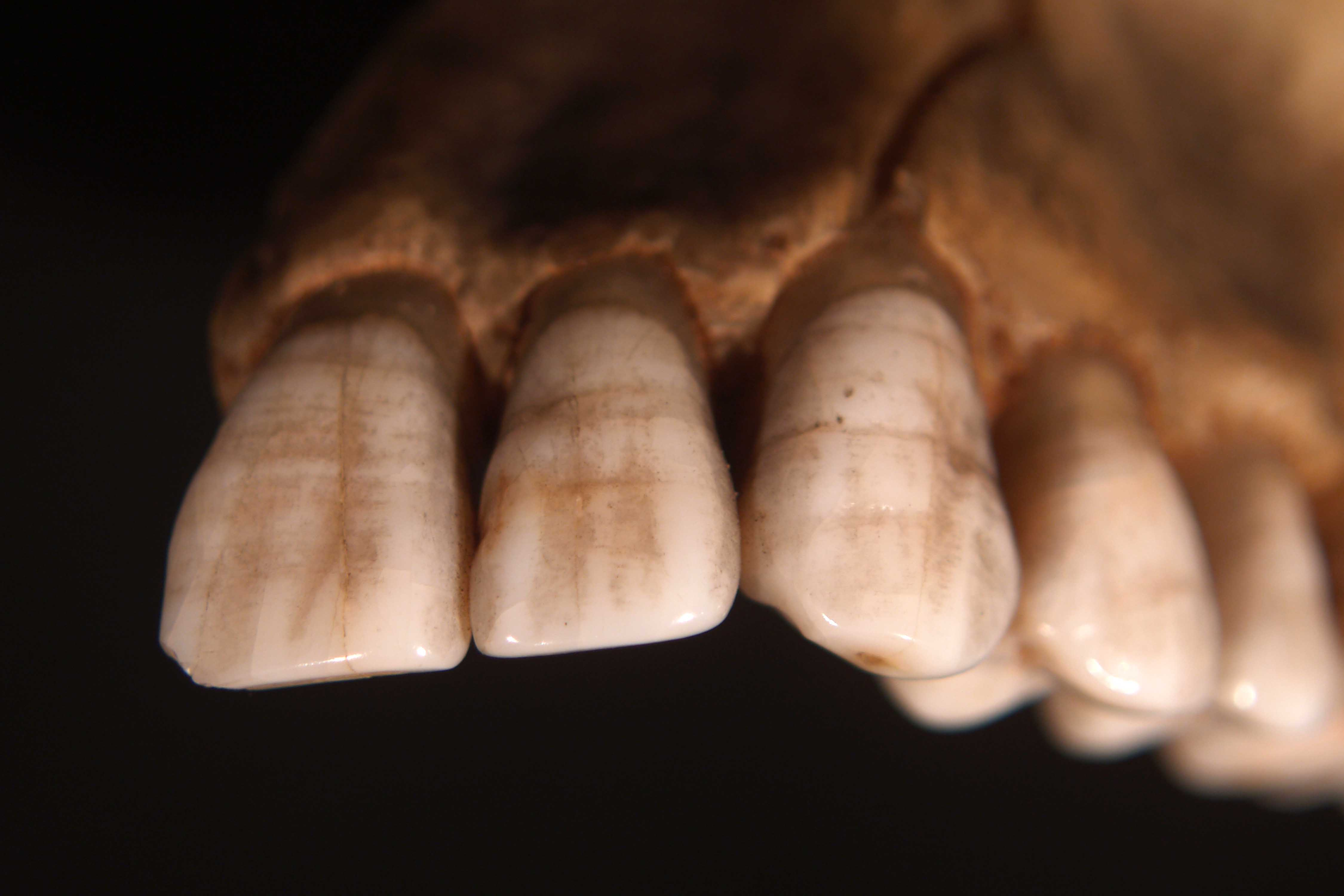
Teeth displaying plane-form enamel hypoplasia.

If Plane-form enamel hypoplasia is suspected, it is imperative to consult a dental professional for further evaluation and management. Diagnosis typically beings with a visual examination, with the dentist looking for common signs such as pitting, depressions, and grooves on the tooth surface. Comprehensive medical and developmental history will likely be reviewed to identify any preexisting or underlying causes.

Imaging, such as X-ray's are often used to assess the extent of the underdevelopment/deficiency of the enamel and identify any other dental complications. This imaging helps the dentist evaluate the severity of the condition and determine a necessary treatment plan. Early detection is imperative in order to plane preventative options or treatments.

== Treatment ==
Treatment for Plane-form enamel hypoplasia varies depending on the severity of the case.

For mild cases, dentist may recommend applying fluoride or using fluoride toothpaste to strengthen the enamel and reduce tooth sensitivity. Another treatment for mild cases would be the placement of dental sealants, dental sealants fill the grooves and pits on the teeth, reducing the risk for further bacteria buildup and decay.

in more severe cases, more restorative measures may be needed. If the tooth is untreatable or significantly weakened, a dental crown may be placed over the tooth allowing the tooth function to restore. in extreme cases, the tooth would be extracted and a dental implant may be considered as a replacement option.

== Prognosis ==
Although prognosis information is limited, it has been found that Plane-form enamel hypoplasia is common within children, due to the tooth development being crucial during these stages of life. Early detection is imperative to halt any further damage to the enamel. Environmental factors such as malnutrition and illness both contribute to the development of the enamel. Being that enamel damage is permanent, there is not a possibility for 'recurrence', but the condition can progress. Progression occurs due to the teeth being more prone to decay and structural damage. To mitigate these risk obtaining dental care is imperative. If the appropriate dental care is performed, affected individuals can maintain a good quality of life. To maintain this quality of life, regular dental check-ups are imperative.

== Epidemiology ==
The occurrence of Plane-form enamel hypoplasia differs throughout various demographic groups. Regarding age, children are more affected by this condition due to the susceptibility of developing teeth to environmental factors. A study in Albania reported that 12.8% of children between 8–12 years experienced some form of enamel hypoplasia. Sex difference have not been indicated for this disease. Plane-form enamel hypoplasia is prevalent in regions that have limited access to dental care and poor nutritional resources. This also includes populations located in lower socioeconomic areas. A study in Iowa found that 6% of well-nourish children have enamel hypoplasia on their primary teeth.

Determinants of Plane-form enamel hypoplasia include both environmental and genetic factors. As stated previously, nutritional deficiencies, systematic illnesses, infections, and exposure to toxins during tooth development can disturb the formation of the enamel. Maternal smoking and certain medications can cause disruption during the pregnancy, leading to lack of enamel development in the fetus. Genetically, conditions such as amelogenesis imperfecta, are inherited conditions that can further cause plane-form enamel hypoplasia.

== Research directions ==
Recent studies have furthered knowledge on Plane-form enamel hypoplasia, focussing on genetic research, diagnostic advancements, and further treatments for the condition.

In 2022 research was conducted on 7,159 individuals within a multiethnic cohort, identifying genetic loci that is associated with Plane-form enamel hypoplasia. The BMP2K and SLC4AR gene was located suggesting its contribution within tooth development, these findings highlight the complexity of enamel hypoplasia.

A 2023 study that was published in the Scientific Reports evaluated the effectiveness of different diagnostic tools when using the tools for enamel hypoplasia. In this study they compared tradition visual exams to advanced imaging techniques such as microscopes, and fluoresced-based devices. They found that using the microscope provided essential viewing that is needed to properly see enamel defects, suggesting that it would be valuable to use within routine dental practices.

There are recent clinical trials that looked into restorative materials to manage plane-form enamel hypoplasia. A study was published in the Journal of Clinical Pediatric Dentistry this year (2024), comparing injectable giomer restorations to injectable composite resin when treating the enamel defect. They found that the injectable giomer was the better alternative providing better durability. Further research is currently being conducted to develop peptide-based gels, mimicking natural enamel formation. The peptide-based gels goal is to rebuild the enamel by replicating the mineralization process that occurs during enamel formation.
