= Early childhood caries =

Dental disease of young children

Early childhood caries (ECC), formerly known as nursing bottle caries, baby bottle tooth decay, night bottle mouth and night bottle caries, is a disease that affects teeth in children aged between birth and 71 months. ECC is characterized by the presence of 1 or more decayed (non cavitated or cavitated lesions), missing (due to caries), or filled tooth surfaces in any primary tooth. ECC has been shown to be a very common, transmissible bacterial infection, usually passed from the primary caregiver to the child. The main bacteria responsible for dental cavities (dental caries) are Streptococcus mutans (S. mutans) and Lactobacillus. There is also evidence that supports that those who are in lower socioeconomic populations are at greater risk of developing ECC.

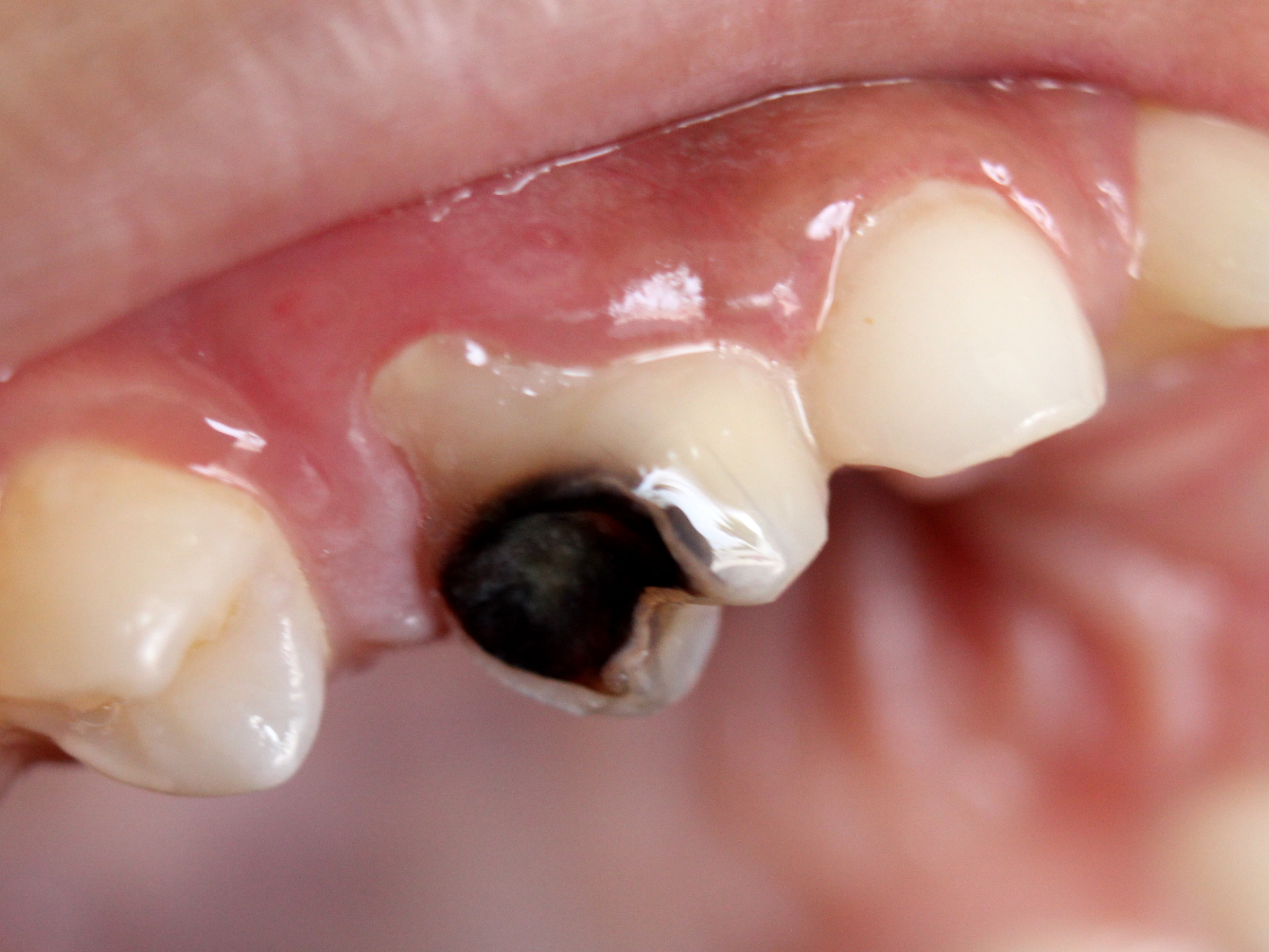
Dental caries (tooth decay) as seen on a child

== Aetiology ==
Early childhood caries (ECC) is a multifactorial disease, with risk factors including but not limited to, cariogenic bacteria, diet practices and socioeconomic factors. Deciduous teeth begin to erupt at 6 months of age, once visible in the oral cavity they are susceptible to tooth decay or dental caries. This can result in the child experiencing severe pain, and needing extensive dental restorations or tooth extractions.

=== Microbial factors ===
The primary cariogenic bacteria involved in ECC are S. mutans and Lactobacillus. The transfer of S. Mutans from mother to infant is well documented. Over time the combination of food debris and bacteria form a biofilm on the tooth surface called plaque. In plaque, the cariogenic microorganisms produce lactic acid as a by-product from fermentable carbohydrates. Examples of these fermentable carbohydrates include fructose, sucrose and glucose. Cariogenic bacteria thrive on these sugars and help to weaken the enamel by causing loss of tooth structure due to the loss of minerals as a result to acid production. A poor oral care routine and a diet that is high in fermentable carbohydrates favor acidic attack in the oral cavity. This prolonged acidic exposure allows the net loss of minerals from the tooth. This diminishes the strength of the tooth which is called demineralization. For the outer layer of the tooth (enamel) to reach cavitation, there is a breakdown of the enamel structure that allows the influx of the cariogenic bacteria. As cavitation progresses into dentine, the dental caries lesion becomes more severe, and this may cause tooth pain.

=== Dietary factors ===
Diet plays a key role in the process of dental caries. The type of foods along with the frequency at which they are consumed can determine the risk for developing carious lesions. Infants and young children may consume fermentable carbohydrates, in the form of liquids such as: fruit juices, and soda pop. These consumables have the potential to increase the risk of dental caries due to prolonged contact between sugars in the liquid and cariogenic bacteria on the tooth surface. Poor feeding practices without appropriate preventive measures can lead to ECC. Frequent and long duration bottle feeding, especially at night, is associated with ECC. This finding can be attributed to the fact that there is less salivary flow at night and hence less capacity for buffering and remineralization. Each time a child drinks these liquids, acids attack for 20 minutes or longer. A parent's education and health awareness has a major influence on the caries experience of their child's feeding practices, dietary habits and food choices.

=== Socioeconomic factors ===
Dental caries still today, remains the most prevalent disease worldwide. Burdening millions of children and continuing into adulthood with pain and potentially lower quality of life. There are several studies by Locker and Mota-Veloso reporting that there is a two-way relationship that exists between dental caries and levels of education, household income that affect quality of life and social positioning. Locker suggested that the relationship between oral disease and health-related quality of life outcomes can be mediated by personal and environmental variables. More health promotion initiatives and policy-making that collaborate directly with the community to increase meeting their needs, should be implemented.

While the primary etiology is due to microbial factors, it is also largely influenced by the social, behavioral and economic determinants in which children are surrounded, including living in a low income earning family. Secondly, having limited access to healthcare and education where important messages about the consumption of cariogenic foods are not being transferred to children or their parents. Efforts should be made to reach rural and remote communities to implement health promotion strategies to increase awareness about diet and oral hygiene.

The education, occupation and income of families also greatly affects the quality of life. Children greatly rely on their parents or guardians for help concerning their health and well-being. Studies have shown that families of lower socioeconomic status (SES) are less likely to regularly attend the dentist and access preventive dental resources. ECC also has an accumulative effect for those that live in rural areas.

== Prevention ==
Early childhood caries can be prevented through the combination of the following: adhering to a healthy nutritional diet, optimal plaque removal, use of fluoride on the tooth surface once erupted, care taken by the mother during the prenatal and perinatal period and regular dental visits. These are just some recommendations to help prevent ECC.

=== Adequate diet ===
Dietary habits and the presence of cariogenic bacteria within the oral cavity are an important factor in the risk of ECC. ECC is commonly caused by bottle feeding, frequent snacking and a high sugar diet.

In regards to preventing ECC through bottle feeding, it is fundamental not to allow the child to sleep using 'sippy cups' or bottles as this is a large risk factor contributing to baby bottle decay/caries. This is highly encouraged as it prevents continuous exposure to non-milk extrinsic sugars and therefore the potential progression of caries – this means the oral cavity can return to a neutral pH and therefore decreased acidity. These researches also suggest trying to introduce cups to children as they approach their first birthday and to reduce the use of a bottle. A low-sugar and high nutritional diet is recommended for both the mother and the child especially during breastfeeding, and it is also recommended to avoid frequent snacking.

A 2019 Cochrane review (updated in 2024) concluded that there is a 15% drop in risk of developing ECC when mothers with infants or pregnant women are given advice on a healthy child diet and feeding practices.

=== Optimal plaque removal ===
On eruption of the first primary tooth in a child, tooth brushing and cleaning should be performed by an adult. This is important as the plaque that attaches to the surface of the tooth has bacteria that have the ability to cause caries (decay) on the tooth surface. It is recommended to brush children's teeth twice daily using a soft bristled, age and size appropriate toothbrush and if indicated age-appropriate amount of fluoridated toothpaste. It is suggested that it is suitable to brush children's teeth until they reach the approximate age of 6 years; when they will begin to develop adequate dexterity and cognition needed for adequate brushing by themselves. It is encouraged to watch children brushing their teeth until they are competently able to brush.

=== Fluoride ===
Fluoride is a natural mineral that naturally occurs throughout the world – it is also the active ingredient of many toothpastes specifically for its remineralizing effects on enamel, often repairing the tooth surface and reducing the risk of caries. The use of fluoridated toothpaste is highly recommended by dental professionals; whereby studies suggest that the correct daily use of fluoride on the dentition of children has a high caries-preventive effect and therefore has potential to prevent ECC. However, it is important to use fluoridated toothpastes correctly; in children under the age of three years, a smear or rice-sized amount of fluoridated toothpaste should be used. In children between the ages of three and six, a pea-sized amount of fluoridated toothpaste should be used. The child should be monitored until they can brush well and efficiently. The child should be taught to spit the toothpaste out after brushing.

=== Pre-natal and peri-natal period ===
Prevention of early childhood caries begins before the baby is born; women are advised to maintain a well-balanced diet of high nutritional value during pregnancy. This is important since teeth start developing before birth if the diet is not sufficient, a condition called developmental dental defect may occur including enamel hypoplasia. Enamel hypoplasia is a developmental defect of enamel that occurs during tooth development, mainly pre-natal or during early childhood. Teeth affected by enamel hypoplasia are at a higher risk of caries since there is an increased loss of minerals and therefore the tooth surface is able to breakdown more easily in comparison to a non-hypoplastic tooth.

=== Dental visits ===
It is recommended that parents and caregivers take their children to a dental professional for examination at six months of age and no later than the child's first birthday. The dental professional will examine the child's teeth and provide recommendations to the parents or caregivers regarding the best way to prevent ECC and what actions to take. Studies suggest that children who have attended visits within the first few years of life (an early preventive dental visit) potentially experience less dental related issues and incur lower dental related costs throughout their lives.

== Treatment ==
=== Early detection and risk assessment ===
The approach to managing Early Childhood Caries involves a combination of restoring or removing the decayed teeth. Dentists also focus heavily on early intervention strategies, which include the application of protective fluoride treatments directly to the teeth, guiding families through proper dental care routines, and offering nutritional advice to prevent further decay. During the initial dental visit, which plays a pivotal role, the dentist evaluates the child's dietary and oral hygiene habits. By doing so, they can identify behaviors that may contribute to tooth decay. These assessments take into account the child's age and their social, behavioral, and medical background.

=== Tailored treatment based on caries risk ===
For children identified as having a low risk of tooth decay, the focus is on monitoring and preventive care rather than immediate dental treatments. Regular dental visits are encouraged to identify any new signs of decay early on. Early stages of decay (white spot lesions) and initial enamel damage are managed with non-invasive preventive methods and are closely monitored over time. High-risk children typically need more intensive treatment. This may include early restorative work to repair and address any existing decay to prevent further deterioration of the teeth. Since ECC affects children under the age of 5 years, dental treatments under general anesthesia may be necessary in select cases. However, there's a notable concern with this method: despite the initial success of the treatment, decay can recur, with some cases reported as early as 6 months post-treatment.

=== Silver diamine fluoride ===
In managing Early Childhood Caries, dental professionals also use. Silver Diamine Fluoride (SDF), a dual-action liquid that combats tooth decay. SDF combines the bacteria-battling power of silver with the tooth-strengthening properties of fluoride. This solution is applied directly onto the affected areas, eliminating the immediate need for drilling and making it a less invasive treatment option.

SDF is known for its cost-effectiveness and ease of application. It effectively halts decay but does not rebuild the tooth structure; hence, a tooth treated with SDF may still require a filling or crown to restore its shape and function. One notable downside is the black staining of the decayed areas after SDF application. Despite this, the discoloration can be masked with a white filling material, a cosmetic concern that may be less significant for baby teeth that will eventually be replaced by permanent teeth.

The quick application process of SDF makes it particularly beneficial for young children and patients who find it difficult to remain still during dental procedures, potentially reducing the need for sedation or general anesthesia. However, the usage of SDF is not without debate. Further high-quality research is required to fully understand its effectiveness, necessity, and potential adverse effects. This consideration gains importance in the context of FDA advisories regarding the use of general anesthetics and sedation in young children. Nonetheless, the American Dental Association endorses SDF as an effective means to manage dental decay in a conservative manner.

=== Stainless steel crowns ===
When it comes to repairing teeth affected by Early Childhood Caries, the extent of tooth decay will guide the choice of treatment. For moderate to severe decay, stainless steel crowns are a common option. These crowns are ready-made and can be tailored to fit over a child's primary molar. The crowns are then fixed in place to restore the tooth. An alternative method for fitting these crowns is the Hall Technique, which does not require the decayed parts of the tooth to be removed first.

=== Atraumatic restorative treatment (ART) ===
For less invasive treatments, Atraumatic Restorative Treatment (ART) is an option. ART involves the partial removal of decayed tooth material with hand tools and sealing the cavity with a bonding material. This approach is particularly suitable for young patients because it is quicker and less likely to cause distress. It's also beneficial when maintaining a tooth is important for spacing in the mouth, paving the way for permanent teeth to erupt properly in the future. However, it's important to note that while ART is a valuable treatment, especially in areas where dental facilities are limited, studies suggest that fillings done with ART may be more prone to failure compared to those done with more traditional methods. Despite this, ART remains a recommended practice for managing tooth decay in young children under challenging conditions.
