= Sam Dodge =

American baseball player (1899–1966)

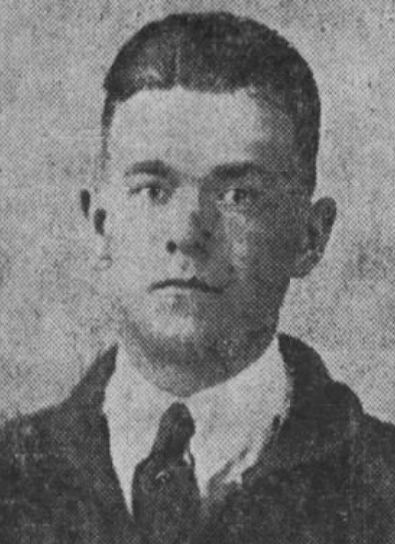
- Dodge c. 1920
- Pitcher
- Born: December 19, 1899; Neath, Pennsylvania, U.S.
- Died: April 5, 1966 (aged 66); Utica, New York, U.S.
- Batted: Right Threw: Right

MLB debut
- September 24, 1921, for the Boston Red Sox

Last MLB appearance
- April 28, 1922, for the Boston Red Sox

MLB statistics
- Innings pitched: 7
- Earned run average: 5.14
- Strikeouts: 3
- Stats at Baseball Reference

Teams
- Boston Red Sox (1921–1922)

Samuel Edward Dodge (December 19, 1899 – April 5, 1966) was an American relief pitcher in Major League Baseball who played between 1921 and 1922 for the Boston Red Sox. Listed at 6 ft 1 in (1.85 m), 170 lb, Dodge batted and threw right-handed. He was born in Neath, Pennsylvania, United States.

Dodge was raised and attended school in Johnson City, New York. He got his start pitching for an independent club in Johnson City where he was noticed by Mike Konnick who was then catching for a team in Reading, Pennsylvania. Konnick recommended him to Red McKee, then managing the Saginaw, Michigan club of the Michigan–Ontario League. Dodge joined the club in April 1920. After struggling to start the 1921 season, he was released to the Flint, Michigan club in July, reportedly because he refused to continue pitching for Flint. The Red Sox purchased his contract in September 1921 for what was reported to be a record price for the league.

Dodge made his Major League debut on September 24, 1921. In one inning of work, he allowed a hit, base on balls and earned run to the St. Louis Browns. It would be his only appearance of the season. He made the Red Sox roster to start the 1922 season. After he accumulated a 4.50 earned run average (ERA) over three appearances in April, his contract was sold to the minor league Springfield Ponies. Manager Hugh Duffy reportedly thought highly of him but felt Dodge, then just 22 years old, would benefit more from getting regular work in the minors than from sitting on Boston's bench. It was reported in The Flint Journal that Duffy had tried to convert Dodge into a knuckleballer during that spring which caused an injury to Dodge's pitching arm. He would not return to the majors. Over seven innings pitched in four career games, he posted a 5.14 ERA with three strikeouts and no decisions.

Dodge finished out the season in Springfield. He was suspended for a time due to poor conditioning and his performance declined. He re-signed in Springfield to start the 1923 season but reported to the team late and in poor condition. In May 1923, before he appeared in a game for Springfield, his contract was sold to the Grand Rapids team of the Michigan–Ontario League. He pitched briefly for Grand Rapids but, on June 2, 1923, he debuted with the Hamilton, Ontario club in the same league.

By 1926, he was reportedly player-manager of a semi-professional team in Flint called the Lincoln Oils which made headlines for traveling to games by airplane. In 1930 and 1931, he managed the semi-pro Owosso Chieftains.

By 1932, he had left Michigan to return to the Southern Tier where he attempted to establish a semi-professional league. In 1933, he coached a team in Kirkwood, New York.
