= Caries vaccine =

Vaccine protecting against tooth decay

A caries vaccine is a vaccine to prevent and protect against tooth decay. Streptococcus mutans (S. mutans) has been identified as the major etiological agent of human dental caries. The development of a vaccine for tooth decay has been under investigation since the 1970s. In 1972, a caries vaccine was said to be in animal testing in England, and that it would have begun human testing soon. Several types of vaccines are being developed at research centres, with some kind of caries vaccines being considered to diminish or prevent dental caries' impact on young people.

== Attempts aimed at S. mutans replacement ==
=== Oragenics and BCS3-L1 ===
Jeffrey Hillman from the University of Florida developed a genetically modified strain of Streptococcus mutans called BCS3-L1, that is incapable of producing lactic acid – the acid that dissolves tooth enamel – and aggressively replaces native flora. In laboratory tests, rats who were given BCS3-L1 were conferred protection against S. mutans that persisted through a six-month follow-up. BCS3-L1 colonizes the mouth and, compared to its native counterpart, overproduces the lantibiotic mutacin 1140, which allows it to out-compete wild-type S. mutans.

Hillman founded Oragenics in 1996 to commercialize BCS3-L1, also known as MU1140-S. The company suggested that BCS3-L1 could confer a lifetime of protection, or, at worst, require occasional re-applications. Hillman further stated that the treatment would be available in dentists' offices and "will probably cost less than $100."

In November 2004 Oragenics got Investigational New Drug approval from the FDA to conduct a Phase I trial on their treatment. The FDA mandated that the trial could only be conducted on people who had a full set of dentures (no teeth), and were under the age of 55. A year later, the company had only managed to enroll a handful of people into the trial, so they went back to the FDA to ask for a different trial design. In 2006 the FDA agreed to a different Phase I trial design. In 2006 Oragenics conducted a small trial on ten people that involved in-hospital monitoring followed by a two month follow-up phase.

Oragenics announced they had shelved development in 2014, citing regulatory concerns and patent issues. According to one report, the company abandoned clinical trials due to enrollment difficulties stemming from the FDA-mandated enrollment criteria. In 2016, Oragenics received a 17-year patent for the product.

On rare occasions the native S. mutans strain escapes into the blood, potentially causing dangerous heart infections. It is unclear how likely BCS3-L1 is to do the same.

=== Lantern Bioworks and "Lumina probiotic" ===
In 2023 Oragenics initiated a materials transfer agreement with the startup Lantern Bioworks. Oragenics sent samples of the BCS3-L1 strain along with detailed protocols on how to create it, in exchange for $50,000 in cash and 10% royalties on commercial sales for ten years. By April, 2024 it was announced that 60 volunteers in Honduras had already received the strain; this was not a clinical trial but rather part of the Lantern Biowork's product launch. Around this time Lantern Bioworks began marketing the strain as a product called "Lumina Probiotic".

By January 2025 the first retail batch, consisting of 500 single-use “cosmetic toothpaste” kits priced at US $250, had been dispatched. The company marketed Lumina solely as a "probiotic" product that “protects enamel and balances oral pH,” a positioning intended to keep it outside U.S. FDA drug regulations.

In July 2025 Lumina announced plans for optional mail-in mouth-swab tests so users can check whether BCS3-L1 has stably colonised. On June 29, 2026 the Berkeley-based blogger Scott Alexander broke the news that "postmarket testing found that the original bacterium couldn't maintain its colonization of the mouth over the long term" and that Lantern Bioworks had "suspended sales while they experiment to see if they can fix this".

== BASF's approach using lactobacillus ==
In 2006 it was reported that BASF was researching replacing native lactobacillus flora with a variety dubbed L. anti-caries, which prevents S. mutans from binding to enamel. However, it is not a long-term vaccination in that no attempt is being made to have a self-sustaining population of L. anti-caries. The intent is that the L. anti-caries population would be frequently replenished through use of a chewing gum containing the organism.

== Attempts using peptides ==
The University of Leeds researched a peptide known as P11-4. When applied to a cavity and coming in contact with saliva, P11-4 assembles itself in a fibrous matrix or scaffold, attracting calcium and thereby allowing the tooth to regenerate. The Swiss-based company Credentis has licensed the peptide and launched a product called Curodont Repair in 2013. Research published in 2014 indicated a positive clinical effect.

== Attempts using antibodies ==
Early attempts followed a traditional approach to vaccination where normal S. mutans was introduced to promote a reaction from the immune system, stimulating antibody production.

Planet Biotechnology developed a monoclonal antibody against S. mutans, branded CaroRx, produced with transgenic tobacco plants. It is a therapeutic vaccine, applied once every several months. Phase II clinical trials were discontinued in 2016.

== Attempts using protein filaments ==
The International Associations for Dental Research and American Association for Dental Research announced a study performed by the Chinese Academy of Sciences which looked at using an inhaled vaccine that uses a protein filament as a delivery vehicle. Trials performed in rats showed an increase in antibody response along with a decrease in the amount of Streptococcus mutans adhering to teeth, leading to significantly fewer cavities observed among the test population.

== DNA vaccines ==
DNA vaccine approaches for dental cavities have had a history of success in animal models. Dental cavity vaccines directed to key components of S. mutans colonization and enhanced by safe and effective adjuvants and optimal delivery vehicles, are likely to be forthcoming. Some believe that the rational target for developing an anti-caries vaccine is a protein antigen, which has adherent functional and important immunogenic regions.

== Bacteriophage treatment ==
The use of Enterococcus faecalis bacteriophages as a form of treatment for caries has been considered, as they are capable of maintaining persistent stability in human saliva.
