= Alice Catherine Evans =

American microbiologist (1881–1975)

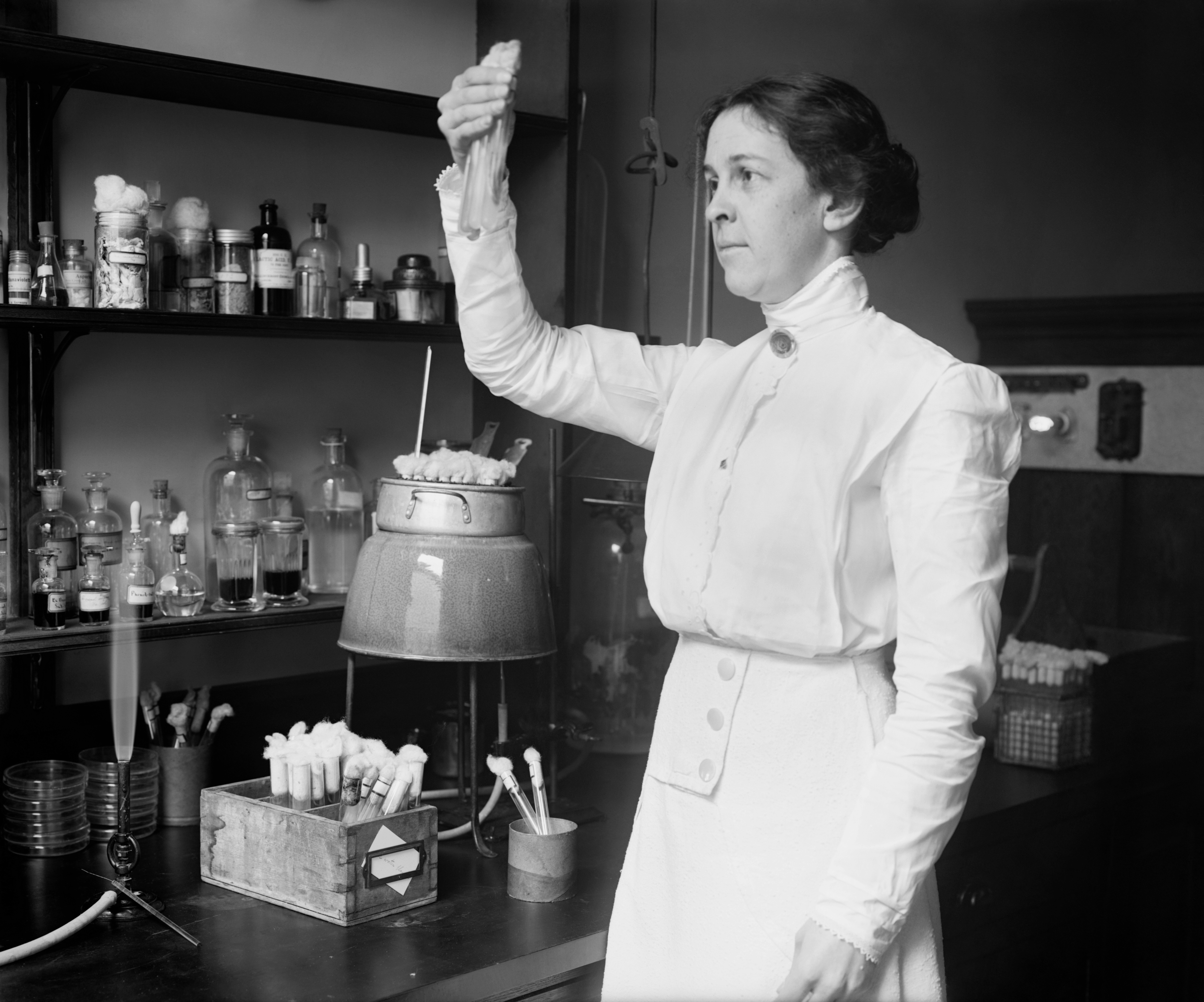
- Born: January 29, 1881; Neath, Pennsylvania, U.S.
- Died: September 5, 1975 (aged 94); Alexandria, Virginia, U.S.
- Education: Susquehanna Collegiate Institute; Cornell University; University of Wisconsin–Madison
- Known for: Demonstrating that Bacillus abortus caused brucellosis
- Scientific career
- Workplaces: U.S. Department of Agriculture; U.S. Public Health Service

Alice Catherine Evans (January 29, 1881 – September 5, 1975) was an American microbiologist. She became a researcher at the U.S. Department of Agriculture where she investigated bacteriology in milk and cheese. She proved that Bacillus abortus (called Brucella abortus) caused the disease brucellosis (undulant fever or Malta fever) in both cattle and humans, which led to the pasteurization of milk in the US in 1930. Evans was the first woman president elected by the Society of American Bacteriologists.

== Early life and education ==
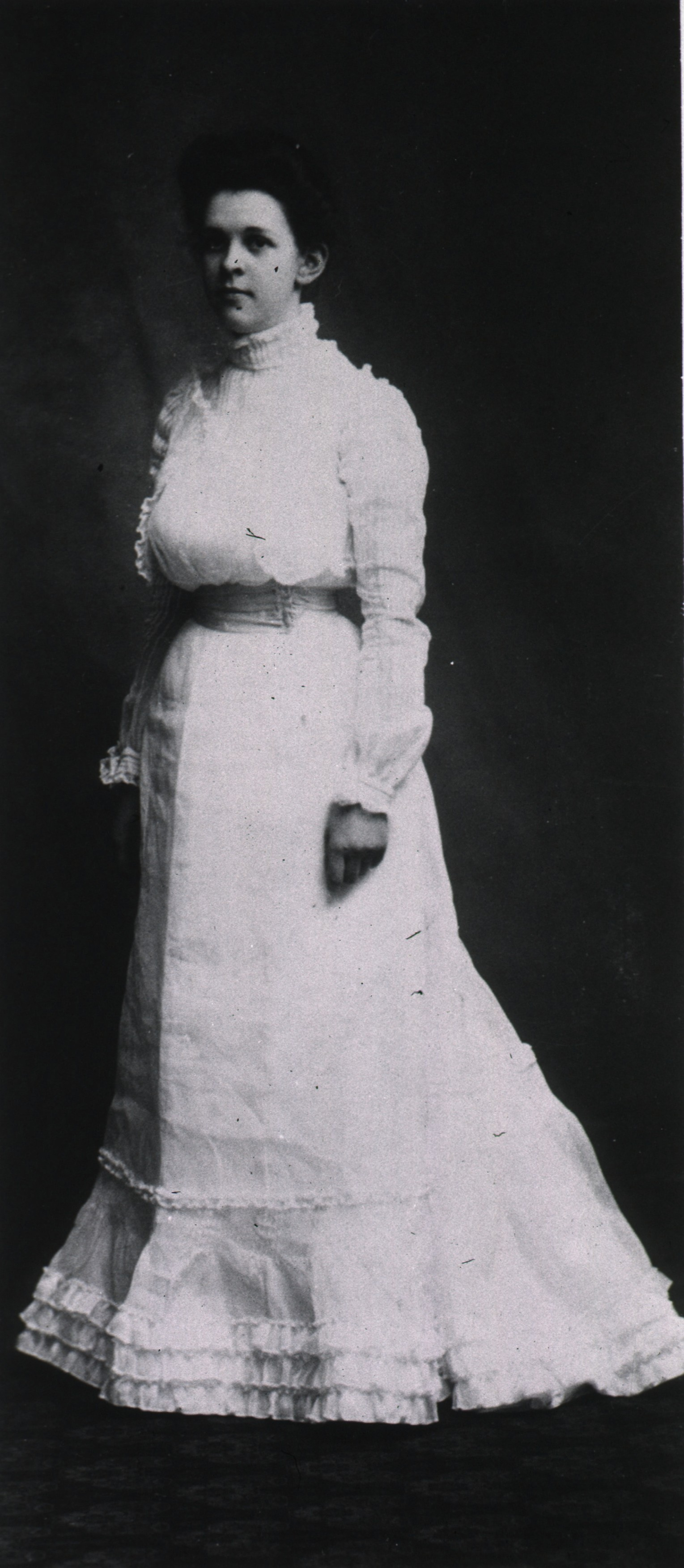
Alice C. Evans, in graduation dress

Evans was born the younger of two children on a farm in Neath, Bradford County, Pennsylvania, to William Howell Evans, a farmer and surveyor, and Anne B. Evans, a teacher. Neath was named after Neath, Wales, where Evans's paternal grandparents had emigrated from in 1831. Between the ages of five and six, Evans was taught at home by her parents and then attended a one-room school house in Neath, where she earned outstanding grades.

She attended the Susquehanna Collegiate Institute in Towanda, where she played on a women's basketball team. Basketball was a new sport open to women, and viewers were shocked by the unladylike sport. At one game, a doctor refused to treat Evans' dislocated finger.

After graduating, Evans became a teacher. In her memoirs, she wrote that she became a teacher because it was the only profession open to women, but she found it boring. Also, like other female scientists during this period, college was not affordable and teaching was seen as the only option. After four years of teaching, she took a free course for rural teachers at Cornell University meant to help them inspire their students to love science and nature. After receiving a scholarship, she wanted to continue her studies in science. Cornell offered bacteriology for free tuition in order to encourage students to pursue the still-new science. While at Cornell, Evans worked as a housekeeper and did clerical work in the alumni library, earning her the nickname "the grind." Evans earned a B.S. in bacteriology from Cornell University in 1909, and was the first woman to receive a bacteriology scholarship from the University of Wisconsin–Madison, where she earned her M.S. the following year. At the end of her studies, her professor Elmer McCollum asked if she would wish to continue her studies, offering her the school's chemistry fellowship. Due to the financial strain of her studies, she decided to enter the workforce instead.

== Work and discoveries ==
Evans was offered a federal position at the Dairy Division of the Bureau of Animal Industry at the United States Department of Agriculture. She accepted the offer in Madison, Wisconsin, and worked there for three years. She worked on refining the process of manufacturing cheese and butter for improved flavor and investigating the sources of bacterial contamination in milk products. She was the first woman scientist to hold a permanent position as a USDA bacteriologist and as a civil servant, was protected by law. Evans found that only one female scientist worked in the BAI before her. Evans decided she, herself, was hired by accident. Each year, Evans took one undergraduate university course, learning German in order to read research reports (prior to World War I, Germany led bacteriology).

In 1913, Evans relocated to Washington, D.C., where the USDA had finished building a new wing. The Bureau of Animal Industry tried to block women from joining them, but Evans was unwittingly admitted through a loophole. She found the Dairy Division more welcoming than the larger Bureau. While there, she worked with B.H. Rawl, Lore Alford Rogers, William Mansfield Clark, and Charles Thom. When Thom left the Dairy Division, Evans was sent to the University of Chicago to study mycology so she could replace Thom as the mycologist.

Evans became interested in the disease brucellosis and its relationship to fresh, unpasteurized milk. Her investigation focused on the organism Bacillus abortus, known to cause miscarriages in animals. She discovered that the microbe thrived in infected cows as well as animals that appeared healthy. The reports hypothesized that since the bacteria was found in cow's milk, a threat to human health was likely.

Evans decided to investigate this; she wondered whether the disease in cows could be the cause of undulant fever in humans. She experimented on guinea pigs as well, confirming her finding that guinea pigs develop brucellosis after being injected with contaminated raw milk. These results provided experimental validation for her claims and strengthened the case for widespread milk pasteurization. She warned that raw milk should be pasteurized to protect people from various diseases. She reported her findings to the Society of American Bacteriologists in 1917 and published her work in the Journal of Infectious Diseases in 1918. She was met with skepticism, particularly because she was a woman and did not have a Ph.D. Specifically, researchers, veterinarians, and physicians did not believe her finding that Brucella abortus was a zoonotic pathogen that causes disease in humans and animals. After publishing, Evans decided to let the issue rest, knowing that her findings would be tested and verified with time.

Evans joined the United States Public Health Service's Hygienic Laboratory in April 1918 to study epidemic meningitis, which was "one of the dread diseases of World War I." George McCoy was in charge of the Hygienic Laboratory and he preferred hiring female scientists. In October 1918, when the Spanish flu came to Washington, D.C., she was asked to change her research's focus to the flu. Early in her work studying the flu, she was infected, and was confined to bed for a month. When soldiers returned from World War I and Streptococcus spread throughout the shanties and tents they lived in, Evans changed her focus again. Her studies of streptococci continued throughout many years of her work. She observed and published about the nascent stage of phage twenty-three years before Winston R. Maxted and Richard M. Krause published similar findings.

In 1920, Dr. Karl F. Meyer and his team confirmed Evans's observation of cow's milk as a source of human brucellosis. Outbreaks in 1922 inspired Evans's continued research, which included studying blood samples and infecting a heifer with Brucella melitensis to see if it would be infected. Despite her colleagues' skepticism, Evans's work was repeatedly confirmed.

However, Dr. Theobald Smith remained an outspoken critic of Evans's discovery. In 1925, after learning that Smith had raised doubt about her findings in the National Research Council, Evans began to worry that the objections of a scientist held in such high esteem would delay the recognition of her findings. She reached out to William H. Welch, who was the Dean of the School of Hygiene and Public Health of the Johns Hopkins University, to aid in her communications with Smith. Six months after Smith responded to a letter from Welch, asking Evans to suspend "judgment until the unknown factors responsible for or contributing to the incidence of the human cases have been brought to light," Evans was invited to sit on the National Research Council's Committee on Infectious Abortion, which was chaired by Smith. At the Hygienic Laboratory, Evans was infected with undulant fever in October 1922, a then-incurable disease that impaired her health for twenty years. Initially, Evans was diagnosed with Neurasthenia due to the lack of recognition of brucellosis. However, in 1928, doctors found lesions from which Brucella was cultivated while performing unrelated surgery on Evans, confirming her diagnosis.

Eventually, Brucella was confirmed as the disease that caused what was then known as undulant fever and Malta fever. In 1928, in recognition of her achievement, the Society of American Bacteriologists elected Evans as their president, making her the first woman to hold the position. Because Evans was the first woman elected president of the ASM, the American Society for Microbiology later established the Alice C. Evans Award for Advancement of Women in her honor. In 2020, Dr. Shelley M. Payne, a researcher in microbial pathogenesis, received the award, highlighting Evans' lasting impact on the field. Evans's findings led to the pasteurization of milk in 1930. As a result, the incidence of brucellosis in the United States was significantly reduced.

Because of a hypersensitivity to brucellar antigen, Evans paused her work with brucellae. In 1936, she resumed her work, but did not handle living cultures. In this study, the team surveyed three cities looking for evidence of brucellar infection and the cause.

In 1939, Evans turned her attention to Hemolytic streptococcus, which she focused on until her retirement in 1945.

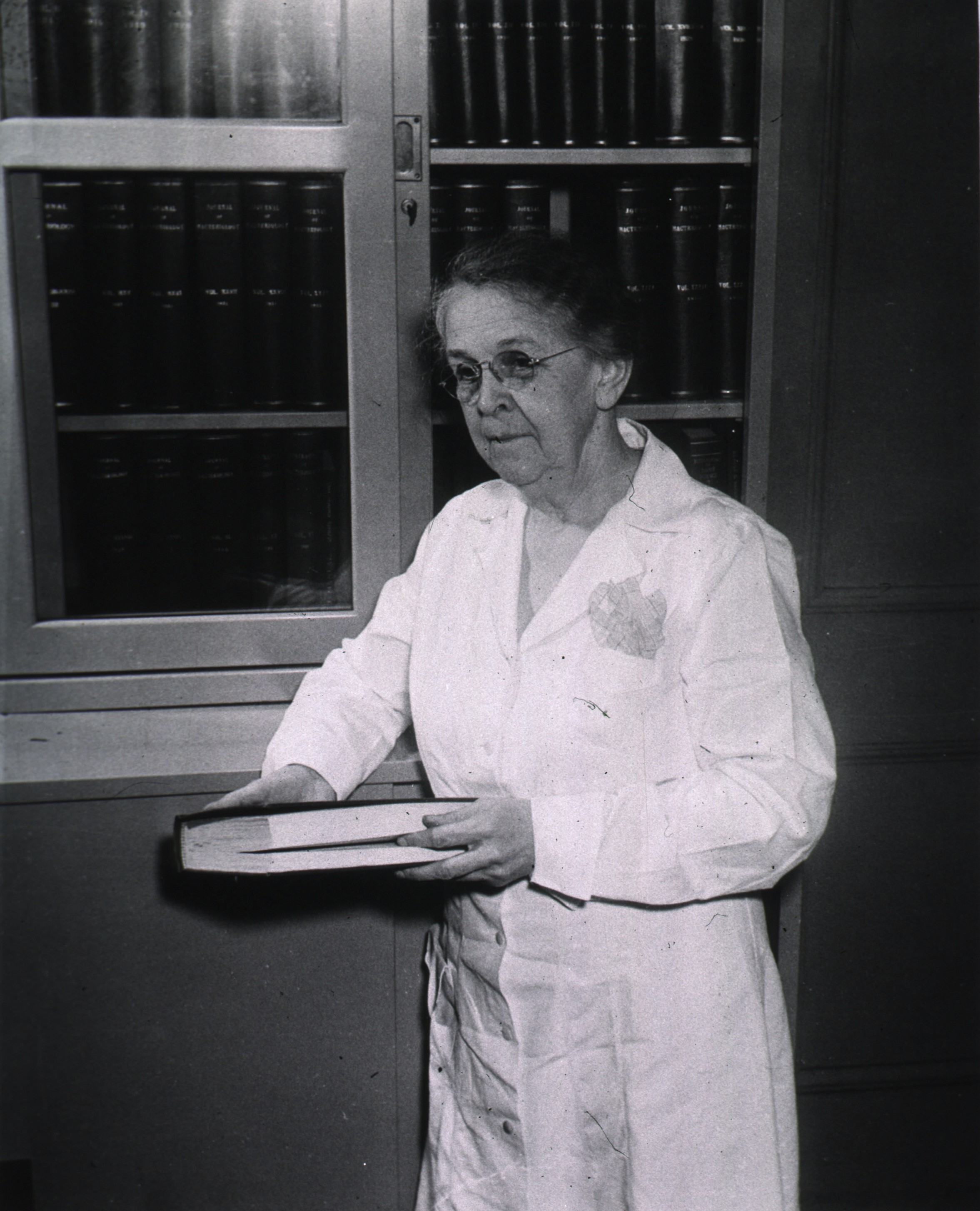
Alice C. Evans, 1945

Evans donated a collection of her papers to the National Library of Medicine in 1969.

== Post-retirement and death ==
Evans officially retired in 1945 but continued working in the field. Following her retirement, she became a popular speaker, especially with women's groups. She gave lectures to women about career development and pursuing scientific careers.

After being retired for sixteen years, Evans returned to writing about brucellosis. With the advent of disability insurance, the literature began suggesting malingering as a cause for failing to recover from brucellosis, so Evans encouraged further study into the disease. In 1963, Evans started writing her Memoirs.

In 1966, Evans protested against the disclaimer of communist affiliation on the Medicare application, claiming that it violated her right to free speech. In January 1967, the Department of Justice agreed that it was unconstitutional and did not enforce the provision.

Evans had a stroke at the age of 94 and died on September 5, 1975, in Alexandria, Virginia. Her tombstone reads, "The gentle hunter, having pursued and tamed her quarry, crossed over to a new home".

== Awards and honors ==
- First female president of the Society of American Bacteriologists, elected in 1928
- Awarded honorary doctoral degree in medicine from Woman's Medical College of Pennsylvania, 1934
- Awarded honorary doctorates of science from University of Wisconsin–Madison and Wilson College, 1936
- Fellow, American Association for the Advancement of Science
- Honorary president, Inter-American Committee on Brucellosis, 1945–57
- Honorary member, American Society for Microbiology, 1975
- Establishment of the Alice C. Evans Award, American Society for Microbiology, 1983
- Inducted into the National Women's Hall of Fame, 1993
- Bacterium Enemella evansiae was named after her, 2020
- The viral family Aliceevansviridae is named after her, 2022

== See also ==
- Timeline of women in science
