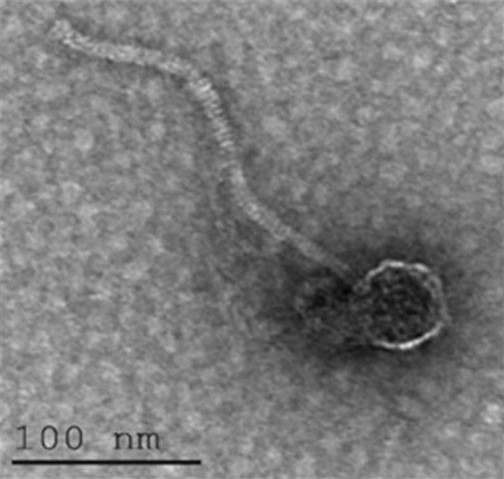
- TEM image of a SMHBZ8 virion

Virus classification
- (unranked): Virus
- Realm: Duplodnaviria
- Kingdom: Heunggongvirae
- Phylum: Uroviricota
- Class: Caudoviricetes
- Family: Aliceevansviridae
- Virus: SMHBZ8

= SMHBZ8 =

Species of virus

SMHBZ8 is a lytic bacteriophage that infects the bacteria Streptococcus mutans. The virus was isolated in 2020.

== Genome and morphology ==
Transmission electron microscopy (TEM) found SMHBZ8 to have a B1 morphology with an isometric head diameter of approximately 56 nm, a long non-contractile tail with an approximate length of 244 nm, and a tail width of 10.9 nm.

Whole genome sequencing revealed a genome size of 32,460 base pairs. Analysis indicated that SMHBZ8 appeared to be related to other S. mutans phages, including M102, M102AD, and APCM01. While all four phages shared approximately 75% sequence identity, core gene analysis identified only seven genes fully conserved across all genomes. SMHBZ8 possessed 32 unique genes compared to the other phages, with two unique genes coding for lysins (QKE60409.1 and QKE60410.1) being identified.

== Research ==
SMHBZ8 has been studied as a possible phage therapy agent to treat tooth decay by infecting and causing lysis in Streptococcus mutans, a key bacteria that produces acid leading to decay. Preclinical studies showed that SMHBZ8 was able to reduce existing biofilms in dentin samples.
