= Macelignan =

- Chemical structure of macelignan

Names
- IUPAC name (8S,8′R)-3-Methoxy-3′,4′-[methylenebis(oxy)]lignan-4-ol
- Systematic IUPAC name 4-[(2S,3R)-4-(2H-1,3-Benzodioxol-5-yl)-2,3-dimethylbutyl]-2-methoxyphenol
- Other names Anwulignan

Identifiers
CAS Number	107534-93-0
3D model (JSmol)	Interactive image
ChemSpider	8579683
PubChem CID	10404245
UNII	8PP3614Z43
CompTox Dashboard (EPA)	DTXSID00148077
- InChI: InChI=1S/C20H24O4/c1-13(8-15-4-6-17(21)19(10-15)22-3)14(2)9-16-5-7-18-20(11-16)24-12-23-18/h4-7,10-11,13-14,21H,8-9,12H2,1-3H3/t13-,14+/m0/s1 Key: QDDILOVMGWUNGD-UONOGXRCSA-N; InChI=1/C20H24O4/c1-13(8-15-4-6-17(21)19(10-15)22-3)14(2)9-16-5-7-18-20(11-16)24-12-23-18/h4-7,10-11,13-14,21H,8-9,12H2,1-3H3/t13-,14+/m0/s1 Key: QDDILOVMGWUNGD-UONOGXRCBH
- SMILES: C[C@H](CC1=CC2=C(C=C1)OCO2)[C@@H](C)CC3=CC(=C(C=C3)O)OC

Properties
Chemical formula	C_{20}H_{24}O_{4}
Molar mass	328.40 g/mol
- Except where otherwise noted, data are given for materials in their standard state (at 25 °C [77 °F], 100 kPa). verify (what is ?) Infobox references

Macelignan (Anwulignan) is a lignan. It can be found in Myristica fragrans, the nutmeg.

== Medical research ==
One study has shown that macelignan may exert antimicrobial and anticariogenic activity against Streptococcus mutans, but this is not a currently used treatment.

Macelignan may also act as an antidiabetic molecule via PPAR signaling and upregulate adipocyte gene expression

Macelignan may contain antioxidant and anti-inflammatory properties and is marketed in breast enhancement creams for its anti-aging properties.
