= Neath, Pennsylvania =

Unincorporated community in Pennsylvania, US

- Unincorporated community
- Location within Pennsylvania
- Coordinates: 41°52′24″N 76°08′07″W
- Country: United States
- State: Pennsylvania
- County: Bradford
- Elevation: 1,148 ft (350 m)
- Time zone: UTC-5 (Eastern (EST))
  - Summer (DST): UTC-4 (EDT)
- Area codes: 570 and 272
- GNIS feature ID: 1204262

Neath is an unincorporated community in Pike Township, Bradford County, Pennsylvania, United States.

== Notable people ==
- Sam Dodge (1889-1966), baseball player, was born in Neath.
- Alice Catherine Evans (1881-1975), microbiologist, was born in Neath.
