= Diocese of the Great Lakes =

Diocese of the Great Lakes may refer to:

- Diocese of the Great Lakes (UECNA) (founded 1998), a diocese of the United Episcopal Church of North America
- Anglican Diocese of the Great Lakes (founded 2010), a diocese of the Anglican Church in North America
- Episcopal Diocese of the Great Lakes (founded 2024), a diocese of the Episcopal Church
