= Deglycyrrhizinated licorice =

Herbal supplement

Deglycyrrhizinated licorice is a herbal supplement typically used in the treatment of gastric and duodenal ulcers. It is made from licorice from which the glycyrrhizin has been removed.

== Research ==
Glycyrrhizin is known to cause undesirable side effects, such as hypertension and edema, and is consequently removed from DGL.

According to the US National Institutes of Health's National Center for Complementary and Integrative Health "Some products that contain licorice root and other ingredients may help relieve digestive symptoms. Because these are combination products, the role of licorice in their effects is uncertain."

Regarding stomach ulcers, specifically, there is "some evidence suggest that specially prepared licorice will speed the healing of stomach ulcers". Licorice protect gastric mucosa, modulate inflammation, and promote mucosal barrier restoration.
