= Linear enamel hypoplasia =

Presence of banded depressions in the enamel surface of teeth

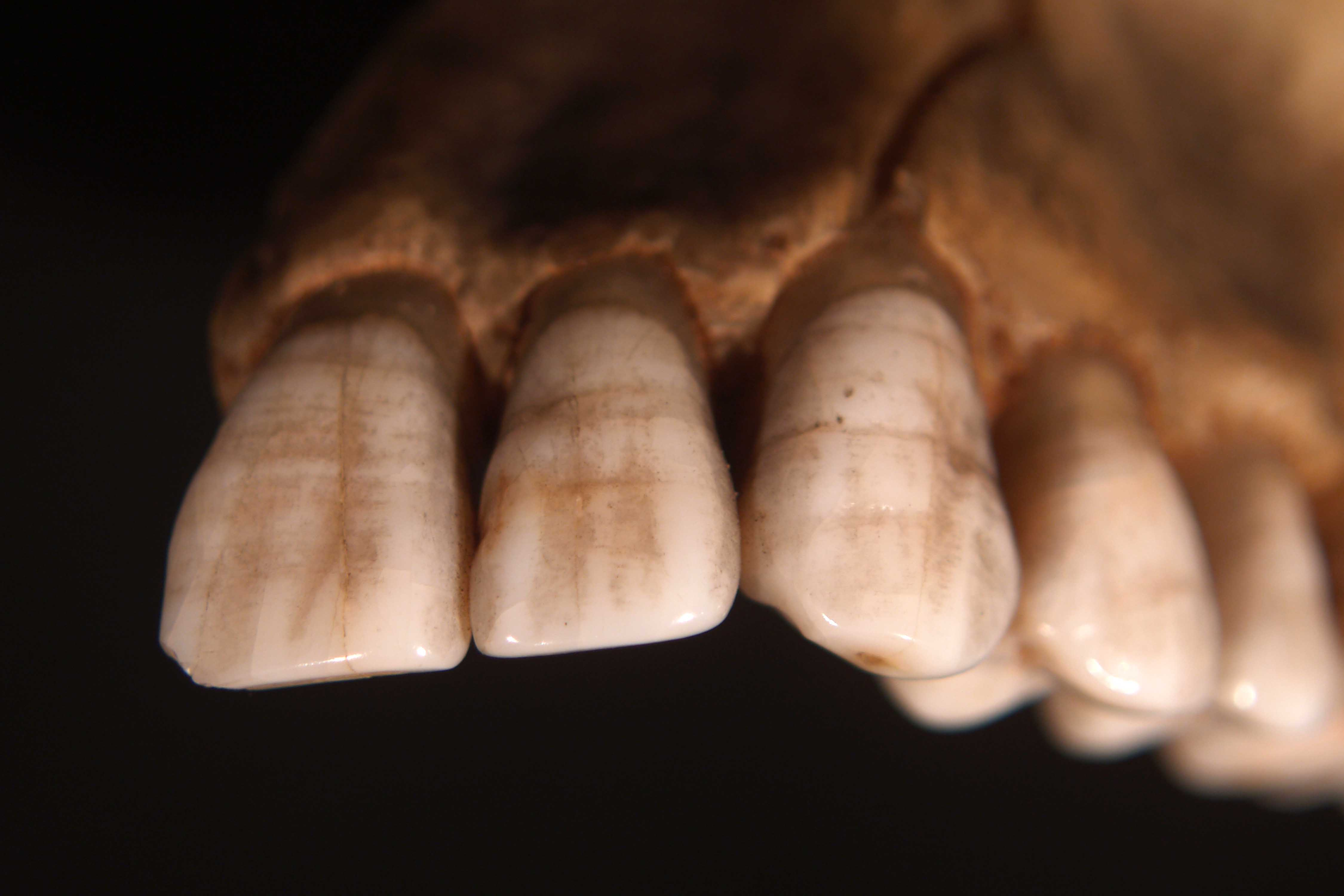
Enamel hypoplasia example

Linear enamel hypoplasia (LEH) is an environmental hypoplasia that occurs as symmetrical, multiple, ring-shaped defects on all tooth surfaces, typically involving more than one tooth. The defects are horizontal bands or grooves, and their severity correlates directly with the duration of enamel growth disturbance. LEH is a significant dental developmental defect because it indicates disturbances in enamel formation due to systemic stress.

The oral impacts of LEH are severe. LEH patients typically complain of temperature, air, and mechanical sensitivity, making them sensitive. They find chewing challenging, with increased susceptibility to caries. The patients are also constantly complaining about repeated failed restoration, and aesthetics, lowering their confidence as well as their overall satisfaction in oral health. It is frequently misdiagnosed in its mildest form, which is typically treated as decay before the disease is discovered.

There are a number of reasons why LEH occurs. Childhood physiological stress during enamel formation can lead to structural defects. Risk factors includes periods of inadequate nutrition combined with a lack of essential nutrients such as Vitamin A, Vitamin D, and calcium enhance the severity of the condition. All these factors influence both enamel formation and the severity and extent of the defects.

LEH is very significant in clinical dentistry as well as anthropology. In clinical use, it plays a significant role in the diagnosis of developmental defects of enamel and in guiding appropriate restorative and preventive procedures. In forensic anthropology and forensic odontology, LEH is a valuable marker of childhood stress experiences in ancient people. It provides data on systemic physiological stress, and hence scientists are able to investigate past health emergencies. For instance, LEH has been used to quantify childhood stress from malnutrition, disease, and other adversity in late-medieval London. Intra-populational and intra-environmental variations in hypoplastic increments in different populations and environments, such as temperature and altitude, yield further comparative data.

== Presentation ==
Linear enamel hypoplasia can produce multiple lesions. Peculiarity of these lesions were that the lesions were present as a linear, ring like defect (all the surfaces of teeth were involved), symmetrical (teeth in the contra-lateral jaw had same lesion on the same position of teeth) and most importantly chronological (the areas of teeth corresponded to mineralization at a particular point of time.

The most commonly occurring enamel hypoplasia was the mild type (58.62%). The mandibular first molar showed the highest prevalence of enamel hypoplasia (19.5%), and the maxillary canines and premolars were the least affected (2.3%). Clinical studies suggest that enamel hypoplasia occurs in teeth that develop within the first year of life, making the incisors and first permanent molars the most frequently impacted. In contrast, premolars, second molars, and third molars are rarely affected as their formation begins at or after age three. While any permanent tooth can be affected, the most common sites of hypoplasia are the permanent first molars and incisors, typically presenting with well-defined defects and distinct areas of hypomineralization.

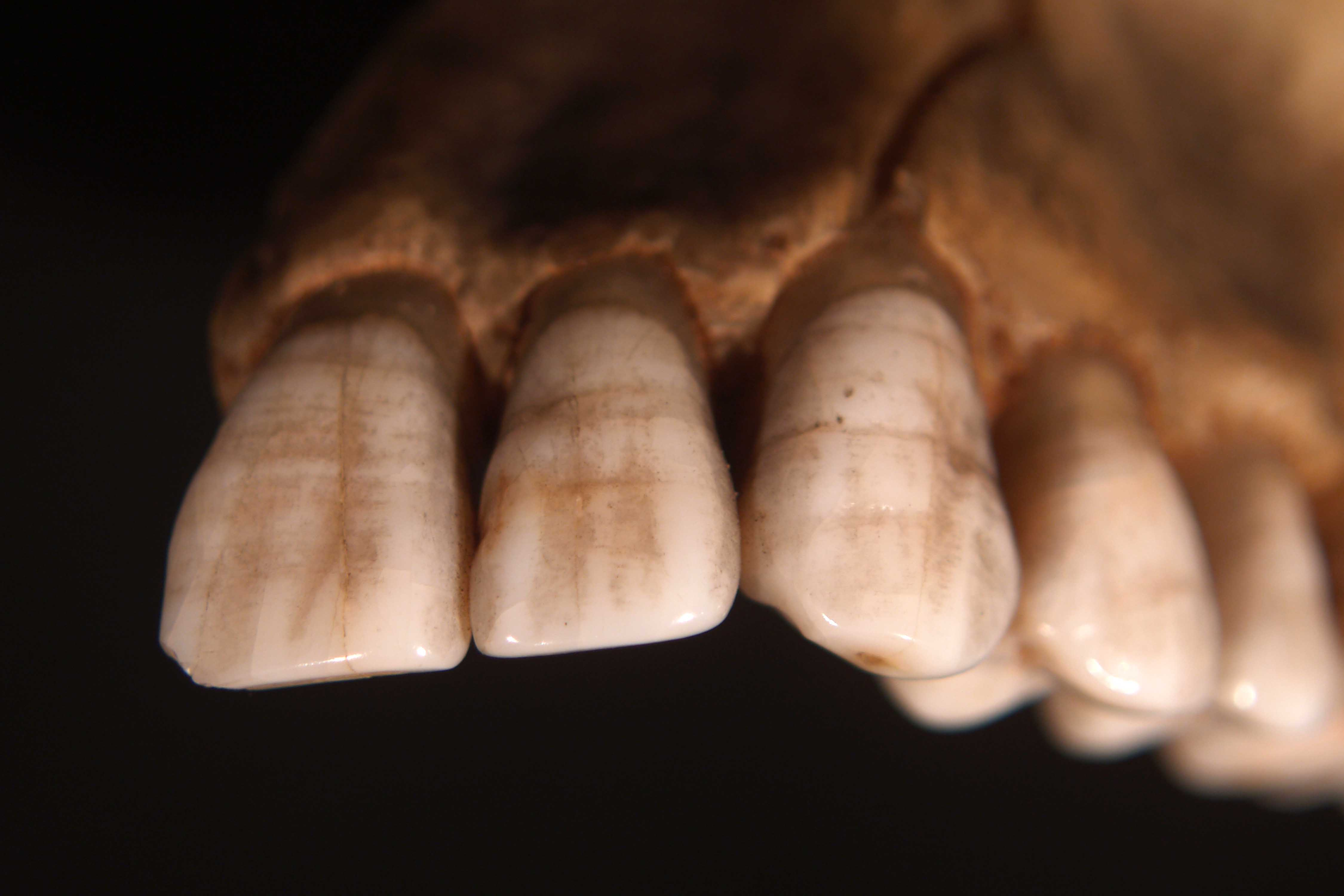
LEH on anterior teeth, visible as symmetrical horizontal grooves across the crowns. These defects indicate systemic physiological stress during childhood that disrupted enamel formation.

== Etiology ==
Linear enamel hypoplasia is a developmental defect characterized by thin tooth enamel and horizontal grooves or lines on the tooth surface, indicating periods of physiological stress or disruption during enamel formation.

Systemic factors play a significant role in LEH development, particularly nutritional deficiencies such as inadequate intake of calcium, phosphorus, and vitamins A, C, and D, which are essential for proper enamel development. Additionally, systemic diseases and infections, including measles, chickenpox, and metabolic disorders like celiac disease, can interfere with enamel mineralization.

Meanwhile, environmental factors that can affect fetal enamel formation include smoking, gestational diabetes, maternal health during pregnancy, especially vitamin D deficiency, and lack of prenatal care. Premature birth and low birth weight can also damage enamel development. Additionally, early-life exposure to toxins such as excessive fluoride, lead, and tetracycline can result in enamel abnormalities. Normal enamel production can also be disrupted by congenital abnormalities, including cleft lip and palate, mechanical trauma, and physical harm to developing teeth. These combined factors highlight the complex interactions that influence enamel development, making LEH a valuable marker for assessing early-life health conditions in both modern and past populations.

Genetic factors also play a significant role in certain cases, where inherited conditions such as amelogenesis imperfecta, Treacher Collins syndrome, and Usher syndrome affect enamel formation. These rare genetic disorders can result in thin or absent enamel due to mutations passed down from one or both parents. Generally, both environmental and genetic influences can impact enamel development before birth and throughout early childhood.

== Pathophysiology ==
Within the framework of developing teeth, ameloblasts function as microscopic factories, dedicated to the construction of the protective enamel layer. These sensitive cells, the architects of our tooth's outer shield, are vulnerable to a wide array of disruptions. When confronted with systemic or environmental stressors, their performance falters significantly, ultimately leading to the manifestation of linear enamel hypoplasia (LEH), a visible testament to developmental disturbance.

Essentially, these ameloblasts are tasked with a complex and finely tuned manufacturing process, a symphony of cellular activity(15). First and foremost, they must synthesize and secrete the proteins that form the very foundation of the enamel matrix, including crucial components such as amelogenin, ameloblastin, and enamelin. However, when the body experiences periods of heightened stress, such as during episodes of high fever, chronic illness, or nutritional deficiency, the delicate cellular machinery responsible for this protein production is profoundly compromised. This disruption directly and adversely impacts both the quality and the quantity of the enamel proteins being produced, resulting in the formation of a thinner, less robust, and ultimately more vulnerable enamel layer.

Simultaneously, the meticulously regulated transport of calcium ions, a mineral absolutely essential for the proper mineralization and hardening of enamel, is also subject to significant disruption. Ameloblasts act as crucial calcium transporters, ensuring that the developing enamel matrix undergoes the necessary solidification process. When the delicate balance of calcium homeostasis is disturbed, often as a consequence of vitamin D deficiency, hypocalcemia, or other systemic imbalances, the enamel fails to mineralize correctly, leading to a structure that is softer, more porous, and therefore more susceptible to the detrimental effects of acid erosion and bacterial invasion.

Furthermore, the structural integrity of the enamel itself is significantly compromised by disruptions to the intricate organization of Tomes' processes. These specialized extensions of the ameloblast cell membrane play a critical role in guiding the formation of enamel rods, the fundamental building blocks that contribute to the strength and resilience of enamel. Exposure to environmental toxins, physical trauma, or other disruptive factors can disorganize these processes, leading to the haphazard formation of enamel rods and the creation of structural weaknesses within the enamel matrix.

In more severe instances, the stressors encountered can directly damage the ameloblast cells themselves, triggering cellular dysfunction or even apoptosis, the programmed cell death that eliminates compromised cells. This results in the formation of localized areas of enamel deficiency, essentially gaps or lacunae within the otherwise continuous enamel structure, further weakening the tooth and increasing its vulnerability.

The clinical consequences of these disruptions are readily apparent upon visual examination. Reduced enamel matrix production leads to the formation of thinner enamel, which manifests as the characteristic visible lines and grooves associated with LEH. Impaired mineralization results in the production of softer, more vulnerable enamel, which is more susceptible to dental caries and exhibits increased sensitivity to thermal and chemical stimuli. Disorganized enamel rod formation weakens the overall structure of the enamel, significantly increasing the risk of fracture, chipping, and other forms of mechanical damage. These defects are permanent because enamel, once formed, lacks the inherent capacity for self-repair, serving as lasting indicators of prior physiological stress experienced by the developing organism.

Linear enamel hypoplasia serves as a tangible and enduring record of past physiological stress, highlighting the relationship between systemic health and dental development.

== Diagnosis ==
Dental enamel hypoplasia are areas of decreased enamel thickness that occur during a disturbance of ameloblast deposition on the developing crowns of permanent and deciduous teeth . Linear enamel hypoplasia (LEH) is identified visually by the presence of horizontal grooves, pits, or lines across the surface of teeth, particularly on the enamel. These defects are usually symmetrical and occur on multiple teeth, often appearing as Shallow or deep horizontal grooves across the enamel, usually parallel to the gumline. Bands of thin or missing enamel, creating a visible difference in texture and color. A rough or pitted surface in the affected areas.

Traditional X-rays, such as panoramic or periapical radiographs, do not effectively capture the surface-level defects of LEH due to enamel's high radiopacity. In contrast, micro-CT can generate 3D reconstructions and cross-sectional views, making it possible to detect and assess even minor enamel hypoplasia that might not be visible through conventional methods. However, micro-CT scanning is highly effective in detecting and analyzing enamel hypoplasia, including linear enamel hypoplasia (LEH). It highlights that micro-CT imaging allows for detailed visualization of enamel thickness variations, detection of hypoplastic lines, grooves, and pits, precise measurement of enamel loss and severity of defects, and estimation of the duration of stress episodes based on enamel defect formation.

Linear enamel hypoplasia (LEH) is a developmental enamel defect caused by systemic stress during enamel formation, such as malnutrition, disease, or trauma. It presents as horizontal grooves or pits across the enamel, primarily affecting anterior teeth. Unlike other enamel defects, LEH impacts enamel thickness rather than mineralization. Diagnosis is typically made through visual inspection and tactile examination with a dental probe. While micro-CT imaging can detect these defects, traditional X-rays are less effective. LEH increases the risk of caries due to the creation of retention sites for bacterial accumulation.

Molar-incisor hypomineralization (MIH) is characterized by hypomineralized enamel resulting from systemic disturbances during early childhood, such as perinatal complications, respiratory illnesses, and environmental toxins like dioxins. It manifests as well-demarcated white, yellow, or brown opacities on the permanent first molars and incisors. The enamel in affected areas is soft and prone to post-eruptive breakdown, leading to rapid deterioration and increased sensitivity. Unlike LEH, MIH affects enamel mineralization rather than thickness. Diagnosis is primarily clinical, with X-rays sometimes revealing porous enamel, though micro-CT provides better visualization. The high susceptibility of hypomineralized enamel to bacterial invasion results in a significantly increased caries risk.

Amelogenesis imperfecta (AI) is a genetic disorder that affects enamel formation due to mutations in genes such as AMELX, ENAM, and MMP20. It results in structurally abnormal enamel that may be thin, pitted, discolored, rough, or entirely absent across all teeth. Unlike MIH or LEH, AI affects both enamel thickness and mineralization from the time of formation. Diagnosis is based on family history, genetic testing, and radiographic findings, with affected teeth often displaying taurodontism or lacking a distinct enamel layer. AI significantly increases caries risk, as weak enamel is prone to rapid wear and sensitivity.

== Management ==
Preventing linear enamel hypoplasia begins with early intervention, primarily focused on reducing risk factors that disrupt enamel formation. Regular pediatric dental visits are essential, as early diagnosis through dental check-ups allows for timely intervention. Dental professionals can monitor enamel development, provide fluoride applications, and recommend interventions tailored to the child's specific needs. Monitoring developmental health is also crucial, as ensuring a child's overall well-being, including proper prenatal care, helps prevent systemic conditions that may contribute to LEH. Conditions such as premature birth, low birth weight, or maternal malnutrition during pregnancy have been associated with enamel defects. Additionally, reducing environmental stressors such as exposure to harmful toxins, managing childhood illnesses, and ensuring a healthy pregnancy can lower the risk of enamel defects. Studies suggest that environmental pollutants such as lead and other heavy metals can interfere with enamel mineralization, further emphasizing the importance of a safe and healthy living environment. Preventive efforts should also extend to educating parents about early childhood nutrition, oral hygiene, and the role of fluoride in strengthening enamel.

Nutrition plays a crucial role in enamel formation, and deficiencies in essential vitamins and minerals can contribute to enamel defects. Ensuring adequate calcium and vitamin D intake is essential for enamel mineralization and overall tooth development. Calcium serves as a primary building block for enamel, while vitamin D enhances calcium absorption, ensuring its availability for tooth development. Iron supplementation helps prevent anemia, which has been associated with enamel defects, while a balanced diet that includes sufficient protein, phosphorus, and vitamins A and C supports enamel health. Vitamin A is particularly vital for ameloblast function, the cells responsible for enamel formation, while phosphorus contributes to enamel hardness. Breastfeeding and proper weaning practices are also vital, as ensuring proper nutrition during infancy can help prevent early-life malnutrition, a known contributing factor to LEH. Malnourished children may experience systemic disturbances that lead to enamel hypoplasia, making nutritional interventions a key preventive measure. In addition to dietary considerations, access to clean drinking water with optimal fluoride levels has been shown to enhance enamel strength and decrease the risk of hypoplasia-related caries.

For individuals with linear enamel hypoplasia, restorative treatments focus on improving tooth function, appearance, and sensitivity. Composite resin restorations are commonly used to fill enamel defects and restore structural integrity, providing both functional and aesthetic benefits. These restorations are particularly useful for mild to moderate cases of LEH. For more extensive enamel loss, porcelain or composite veneers can cover hypoplastic areas, significantly improving esthetics and offering a long-lasting solution. Professionally applied fluoride varnishes or gels help reduce hypersensitivity and enhance remineralization, strengthening the remaining enamel structure. Fluoride treatments have been shown to increase enamel hardness and decrease demineralization, making them an essential component of managing LEH. In some cases, dental sealants may be applied to the affected teeth to protect against caries progression and further enamel breakdown. Sealants create a barrier over vulnerable enamel, preventing bacterial infiltration and decay. Some clinicians also explore the use of minimally invasive techniques such as resin infiltration to treat early-stage enamel defects and improve the overall appearance of affected teeth. Other modern approaches, such as bioactive materials that release calcium and phosphate, may offer additional benefits in remineralizing and strengthening hypoplastic enamel.

Linear enamel hypoplasia can also impact occlusion and orthodontic treatment planning. It is important to assess enamel integrity before initiating orthodontic treatment, as weak enamel may influence the choice of orthodontic appliances. Conventional orthodontic brackets may exert forces that weaken already fragile enamel, increasing the risk of enamel fractures or further demineralization. Patients with LEH may also be more susceptible to enamel breakdown during orthodontic treatment, increasing the risk of demineralization, particularly in cases involving fixed appliances. Orthodontists may use special adhesives or modified treatment approaches to minimize enamel stress and prevent further damage. Clear aligners may be a more suitable option for some patients, as they exert less direct pressure on the enamel surface. Additionally, orthodontic treatment may need to be adjusted to accommodate teeth with structural weaknesses, ensuring that forces applied during treatment do not exacerbate the enamel defects. Custom treatment planning is necessary to ensure long-term oral health and stability, with close monitoring of enamel integrity throughout the course of orthodontic therapy. In severe cases of LEH where the structural integrity of the teeth is significantly compromised, orthodontic treatment may need to be postponed or modified to prevent excessive damage.

== Epidemiology ==
Its prevalence changes dramatically with the environment, socioeconomic status, and genetics, among other things. Nutritional stress, infectious diseases, and environmental extreme weather often correlate with high LEH frequencies. Modern day, poor communities with low healthcare access and malnutrition have rampant LEH. More developed regions with advanced healthcare and nutrition have lower LEH cases.

=== Socioeconomic factors ===
Socioeconomic factors contribute significantly to the manifestation of LEH. Children born into poorer families are more likely to be malnourished and lack important nutrients such as calcium, vitamin D, and phosphorus that aid during the formation of enamel. Further, people living in poorer communities also face a lack of healthcare which means that infections and fevers that need immediate attention tend to remain unattended which increases the chances of acquiring an enamel defect. Moreover, environmental pollution due to toxins such as lead, or an unbalanced levels of Fluoride, can lead to hypoplasia of the enamel.

=== Geographic factors ===
In regions with harsh environmental conditions, such as extreme cold or drought, food availability may be limited, resulting in nutritional deficiencies that impact enamel development. Urban populations typically have better access to healthcare and balanced diets, whereas rural communities may experience food insecurity and inadequate medical facilities, increasing the risk of LEH. Water quality is another important factor, as excessive fluoride or other contaminants in drinking water can cause enamel defects. Additionally, areas with high disease prevalence, such as those affected by malaria or tuberculosis, may see increased cases of LEH due to systemic stress on the body.

== Anthropological and forensic significance ==
=== LEH in Bioarchaeology ===
LEH serves as an essential marker in bioarchaeological studies, allowing researchers to assess episodes of physiological stress during early development. The presence and prevalence of LEH in skeletal populations provide critical information about the health and nutritional status of past societies.

One of the primary uses of LEH in bioarchaeology is identifying periods of childhood stress. Enamel forms in a chronological sequence, and any disruption during this process results in defects that correspond to specific ages of stress exposure. By analyzing LEH patterns, researchers can estimate the timing and severity of past health disturbances.

Moreover, LEH contributes to reconstructing ancient health and environmental conditions. The frequency and distribution of LEH across populations provide insights into historical subsistence strategies, dietary deficiencies, and disease burdens. High LEH prevalence often correlates with periods of famine, climate fluctuations, or economic instability, making it a useful tool for understanding past human resilience and adaptation

=== LEH in forensic dentistry ===
Age estimation is one of the key applications of LEH in forensic dentistry. By analyzing the location of LEH defects and correlating them with known enamel development timelines, forensic experts can determine the approximate age at which stress events occurred. This information aids in constructing biological profiles for unidentified individuals and narrowing down potential matches in missing persons cases.

Additionally, LEH contributes to health history reconstruction. The presence of multiple LEH defects suggests repeated episodes of childhood stress, which may be linked to chronic illness, malnutrition, or adverse living conditions. When used alongside other skeletal and dental markers, LEH helps forensic scientists build a comprehensive understanding of an individual's life history, improving identification efforts
